= Digital cassettes =

Digital audio cassette formats introduced to the professional audio and consumer markets:

- Digital Audio Tape (or DAT) is the most well-known, and had some success as an audio storage format among professionals and "prosumers" before the prices of hard drive and solid-state flash memory-based digital recording devices dropped in the late 1990s. Hard-drive recording has mostly made DAT obsolete, as hard disk recorders offer more editing versatility than tape, and easier importation into digital audio workstations (DAWs) and non-linear video editing (NLE) systems.
- Digital Compact Cassette was intended as a digital replacement for the mass-market analog cassette tape, but received very little attention or adaptation. Its failure is generally attributed to higher production costs than audio CDs, durability and indifferent reception by consumers.

Digital video cassettes include:

- Betacam IMX (Sony)
- D-VHS (JVC)
- D1 (Sony)
- D2 (Sony)
- D3
- D5 HD
- Digital-S D9 (JVC)
- Digital Betacam (Sony)
- Digital8 (Sony)
- DV
- HDV
- ProHD (JVC)
- MiniDV
- MicroMV

== Analog cassettes used as digital data storage ==
- Historically, the compact audio cassette which was originally designed for analog storage of music was used as an alternative to disk drives in the late 1970s and early 1980s to provide data storage for home computers.
  - There is a number of unique and incompatible cassette tape data storage formats that all use the same analog compact audio cassette tape media.
- The ADAT system uses Super VHS tapes to record 8 synchronized digital audiotracks at once.
- There have also been several audio recording systems that used VHS video recorders as storage devices and video tape transports, generally by encoding the digital data to be recorded into an analog composite video signal (which resembles static) and then recording this to magnetic tape. These systems were often used as "mixdown" recorders, to record the finished mix from a multi-track recorder in preparation for the manufacture of a vinyl record, cassette tape, or CD. An example was the Dbx Model 700. Another example is the Sony PCM adaptor series.
- Several companies sold VHS backup solutions in the 1980s and 1990s where data was converted to a video image which was then saved onto a VHS tape.
  - the Corvus "Mirror" ( U.S. patent 4380047A )
  - the Metrum Model 64 on S-VHS tape,
  - the Danmere Backer tape backup system,
  - the Alpha Microsystems Videotrax
  - the Legacy Storage Systems International VAST (Variable Array Storage)
  - the ArVid
  - the Video Backup System Amiga,
  - The S2 VLBI system at three NASA Deep Space Network complexes and over 20 other radio telescopes stores digital data on SVHS tapes.
