= Double-system recording =

Sound recorded separately for film

Double-system recording is a form of sound recording used in motion picture production whereby the sound for a scene is recorded on a tape machine that is separate from the camera or picture-recording apparatus.

Double-system recording is the standard procedure on motion pictures that are originally photographed on film. Recording sound-on-film directly at the time of photography has several technical limitations, and no professional motion picture camera supports this option, so all production sound is recorded on a separate recorder. This procedure requires that both camera and sound recorder share a very accurate time reference, and that the speed of the camera and sound recorders be carefully governed. Originally this was done with an electro-mechanical interlock between the camera and recorder, necessitating a physical link, a cable, between recorder and camera. As quartz-based timers came into common use, film cameras and sound recorders adopted these, and these were accurate enough to remove the need for an interlock cable.

Double-system recording requires that sound and picture be manually synchronized at the start of every "take" or camera run. This task was performed by the clapper slate. A clap sound on the recording is matched to the closed clapper image on the printed film, and thus the two recordings can be realigned into sync.

Before magnetic recording, a double-system sound recorder was generally a phonograph lathe. Once magnetic recording became viable, a succession of magnetic sound recorders, culminating in the Nagra, were the standard. As of 2007, most double-system production sound is recorded with hard disk drive-based digital recorders, with a DAT backup.

When the apparatus recording sound and image are the same, as in a video tape recorder, sound is recorded directly onto the picture medium, and this procedure is called 'single-system recording'. On feature films that are photographed on high-definition video, audio is often recorded on the video recorder and also on secondary recorder.

== See also ==
- Sound follower
- Single-system recording
- ADAT
- Digital Audio Stationary Head
- Digital Data Storage (DDS)
- Magnetic storage
- Magnetic tape
- PCM adaptor
- ProDigi
