= Sync sound =

Sound recorded at the time of the filming of movies

Sync sound (synchronized sound recording) refers to sound recorded at the time of the filming of movies. It has been widely used in movies since the birth of sound movies.

== History ==
Even in the silent film era, films were shown with sounds, often with musical accompaniment by a pianist or an orchestra keeping time with the screen action. The first synchronization was a turning recording device marked with a white spot. As the white spot rotated, the cameraman hand-cranked the camera to keep it in sync with the recording. The method was then repeated for playback, but with the projectionist hand cranking the film projector. "Single-system" sound recorded sound optically to part of the original camera film, or magnetically to a stripe of magnetic coating along the film edge.

"Double-system" sound used independent cameras and sound recorders. The first sync sound standard used recorders and cameras both powered by AC (alternating current) motors - essentially clock motors.

Later the 50 Hz or 60 Hz sine wave, called a Pilottone, was recorded on a second parallel track of an audio recorder.

In double-system film, speed variations of camera and recorder, as well as the elasticity of the magnetic recording tape, require some positive means of keying the dialogue to its appropriate film frame. The inclusion on the sound recorder of a second, parallel, sync or "Pilotone" track, has been the most common method in use until today. In video recording, synchronism is electronically generated and generally called dual-system sound

On location, a camera is driven by a DC motor, with some sort of governor control to hold it fairly accurate at 24 fps, a sync pulse generator geared to the movement or motor shaft could be employed to provide the sync pulse output. A cable conducts the sync pulse from camera to sound recorder. The sync pulse is typically a sine wave of 50 or 60 Hz with an RMS amplitude of approximately 1 volt.

This double-system audio recording could then be transferred or "resolved" to sprocketed magnetic film, with sprocket holes that match one to one with the original camera film. These two sprocketed media could be run through a "Moviola" or flat-bed editing table such as the Steenbeck for synchronous sound editing.

With the introduction of the Bulova "Accutron" watch that used a tuning fork as a time reference (watches later used an oscillating electronic crystal), the camera no longer needed to be connected to the sound recorder with a cable. The camera speed was controlled by one oscillator, and a second oscillator in the recorder generated the Pilotone.

This method was developed in the 1960s by pioneering filmmaker Richard Leacock. It was called Direct Cinema. Filmmakers abandoned the studio and went out on location to film, often with hand-held cameras.

In 1972, Bell & Howell brought out a consumer version of a double-system Super-8 sound filmmaking system called "Filmosound". A compact cassette recorder was attached to the camera with a cable that transmitted a single pulse to the recorder every time a new frame of film was exposed in the camera. On playback, the cassette recorder pulse was used to control the projector speed.

At that time, Ricky Leacock, a professor in the MIT architecture department film section, developed a Super-8 film production system with a crystal-controlled camera, a crystal-generated Pilotone cassette recorder, a sprocketed magnetic film recorder, a flatbed editing table, and a projector. The MIT/Leacock System was funded with a $300,000 grant from the founder of Polaroid, Edwin Land.

In 1973, the one-pulse-per-frame technique was used to control recording directly onto sprocketed magnetic film in the Super8 Sound Recorder. The Super8 Sound Recorder could also "resolve" sound that had been recorded onto cassette tape with this new "digital" sync pulse.

Today, digital video cameras and digital sound recorders synchronize electronically, being used for double-system video production.

== Pioneering films ==
- On the Bowery by Lionel Rogosin (1956)
- Chronicle of a Summer by Jean Rouch (1958)
- The Snowshoers (Les Raquetteurs) by Michel Brault and Gilles Groulx (1958)

== Sync sound in Asia ==
In Hong Kong, sync sound was not widely used until the 1990s, as the generally noisy environment and lower production budgets made such a method impractical.

Indian films shot using sync sound include the first Indian talkie Alam Ara released in 1931 and art house films such as Satyajit Ray's Pather Panchali. The then popular Mitchell camera, which could be operated silently made it possible to shoot in sync sound. However, due to the change of shooting environments from studios to locations, as well as the surging popularity of the more portable but noisy Arri 2c camera, shooting with sync sound became less common during the mid 60s. Thus, most Indian films, including Hindi films, shot after the 1960s do not use sync sound and for that very reason the 2001 films Lagaan and Dil Chahta Hai were noted for its use. The common practice in the Indian film industry, even today, is to dub the dialogues during post-production.

== See also ==
- Timecode
