= Single system =

Single system may refer to:

- Single-system image, a concept in cluster computing
- Single-system interpretation, a concept in Marxist theory
- Single-system recording, a concept in film production
