= Transport (recording) =

A transport is a device that handles a particular physical storage medium (such as magnetic tape, audio CD, CD-R, or other type of recordable media) itself, and extracts or records the information to and from the medium, to (and from) an outboard set of processing electronics that the transport is connected to.

A transport houses no electronics itself for encoding and decoding the information recorded to and from a certain format of media. It only extracts and records information to the media, as well as handling mechanical operations for accessing the media itself, such as playing or rewinding a tape, or accessing the tracks on a disc.

An example of a transport for a storage medium would be an audiophile-grade audio CD transport, which houses no digital-to-analog converter (DAC), unlike most ordinary audio CD players. Instead, the audio CD transport is connected to an external DAC via a coaxial (SPDIF) or optical (Toslink) digital audio connection to convert the digital audio information to analog for interfacing to most audio equipment.

Other examples of transports for recorded media include:

- A 16-track magnetic reel-to-reel tape recorder (using 1" wide tape) manufactured by Honeywell (the model 5600E) that was originally designed for recording instrumentation data, which was adapted for the Soundstream digital audio recording system developed in the mid-70s, and referred to by Soundstream as the "HTD" or Honeywell Tape Drive. It was in this case connected to external digital audio processing hardware (the "DTR", or Digital Tape Recorder, although it housed just the electronics for the HTD) designed by Soundstream,
- The S-VHS videocassette mechanism utilized by ADAT-format multi-track digital audio recorders made by Alesis,
- The Hi8 videocassette mechanism utilized by DTRS-format multi-track digital audio recorders made by Tascam such as the DA-88, and
- A standard video cassette recorder (particularly using U-matic cassettes) used for recording digital audio with a PCM adaptor.
