= Digital recording =

Audio or video represented as a stream of discrete numbers

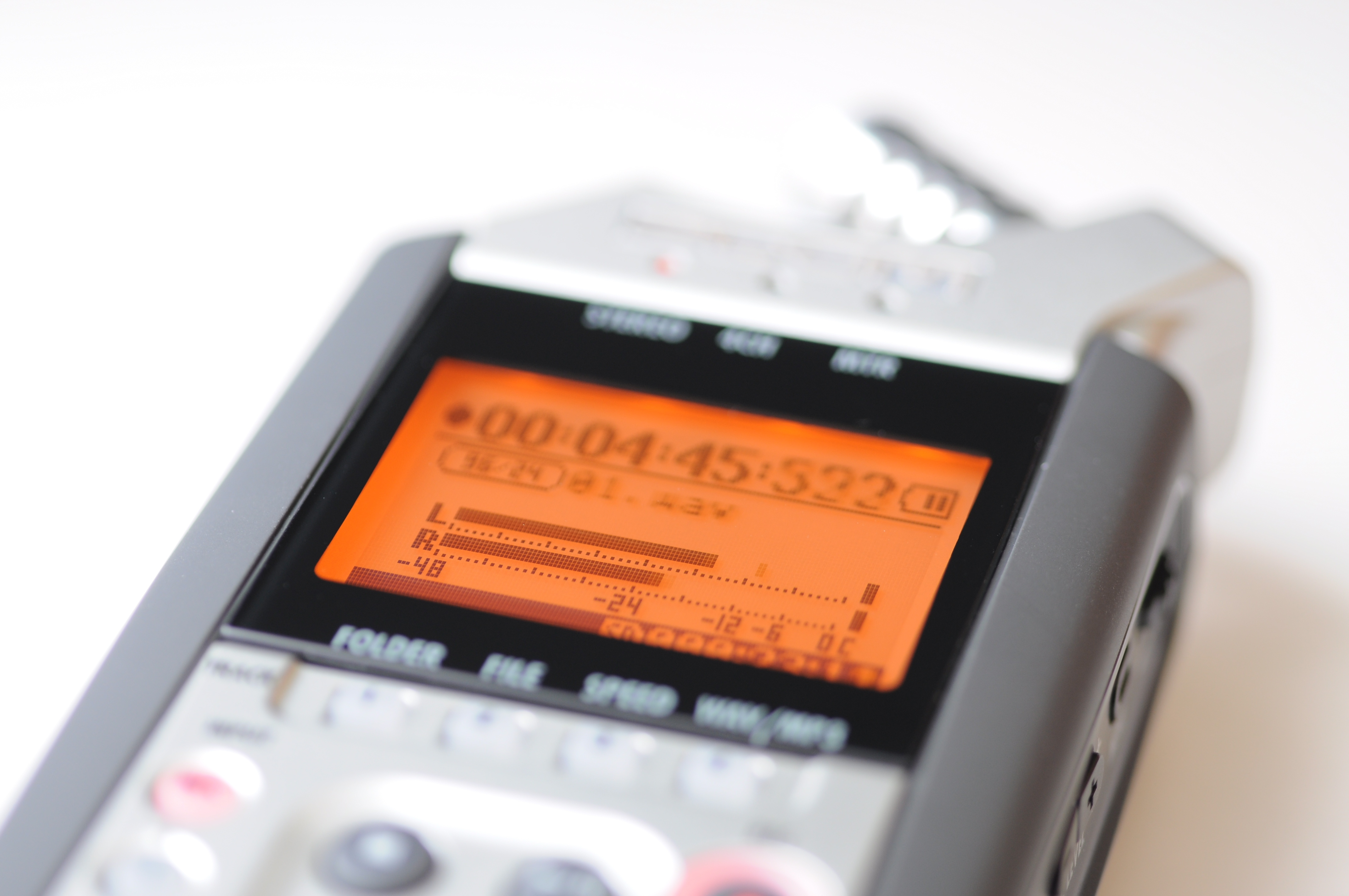
Audio levels display on a digital audio recorder (Zoom H4n)

In digital recording, an audio or video signal is converted into a stream of discrete numbers representing the changes over time in air pressure for audio, or chroma and luminance values for video. This number stream is saved to a storage device. To play back a digital recording, the numbers are retrieved and converted back into their original analog audio or video forms so that they can be heard or seen.

In a properly matched analog-to-digital converter (ADC) and digital-to-analog converter (DAC) pair, the analog signal is accurately reconstructed, within the constraints of the Nyquist–Shannon sampling theorem, which dictates the sampling rate and quantization error dependent on the audio or video bit depth. Because the signal is stored digitally, assuming proper error detection and correction, the recording is not degraded by copying, storage or interference.

== Timeline ==
- October 3, 1938: British telephone engineer Alec Harley Reeves files at the French Patent Office the first patent describing the technique known today as pulse-code modulation (PCM). On November 22, 1939, Reeves files also in the US. It was first proposed as a telephony technology.
- 1943: Bell Telephone Laboratories develops the first PCM-based digital scrambled speech transmission system, SIGSALY, in response to German interception of military telephone traffic during World War II. The twelve transmission points were retired after the war.
- June 1950: Differential pulse-code modulation (DPCM) developed by C. Chapin Cutler at Bell Labs.
- 1957: Max Mathews of Bell Labs recorded the first computer-generated music, a 17-second piece called "The Silver Scale" composed by his co-worker Newman Guttman.
- 1967: The first commercial PCM encoder (monaural) was developed by NHK's research facilities in Japan. The 30 kHz 12-bit device used a compander (similar to DBX Noise Reduction) to extend the dynamic range, and stored the signals on a video tape recorder.
- 1969: NHK expands the PCM encoder's capabilities to two-channel stereo and 32 kHz 13-bit resolution.
- 1969: The charge-coupled device, the first image sensor used in digital imaging, invented by Willard S. Boyle and George E. Smith at Bell Labs, based on MOS capacitor technology.
- 1970: James Russell patents the first digital-to-optical recording and playback system, which would later lead to the Compact Disc.
- January 1971: Using NHK's experimental PCM recording system, Dr. Takeaki Anazawa, an engineer at Denon, records the world's first commercial digital recordings, The World Of Stomu Yamash'ta 1 & 2 by Stomu Yamash'ta (January 11, 1971) and Something by Steve Marcus & Jiro Inagaki (January 25, 1971). Both had to be recorded live, without edits. Marcus is released first (on LP, in February 1972), making it the first released digital recording. On January 27, Yamash'ta records Metempsychosis in the Nippon Columbia studio, Tokyo, with percussion and a brass section.
- 1972: Using lessons learned from the NHK encoder, Denon unveils a desk-sized 8-channel PCM encoder, the DN-023R, which uses 47.25 kHz 13-bit PCM resolution and 4-head open reel broadcast video tape recorder. The first recording with this new system is the Smetana Quartet performing Mozart's String Quartets K.458 and K.421, recorded in Tokyo April 24–26 and released that October. At least six other Denon-recorded digital LP records are released in October, including jazz, classical and traditional Japanese music.
- 1973: Adaptive differential pulse-code modulation (ADPCM) developed by P. Cummiskey, Nikil Jayant and James L. Flanagan at Bell Labs.
- December 2–3, 1974: The Paillard Chamber Orchestra records the first digital recording outside Japan, in Paris' Notre Dame Cathedral, using Denon's newly developed second-generation compact DN-023RA. Bach's "The Musical Offering" (BWV 1079) is released on LP May 1975.
- December 12–19, 1974: Helmuth Rilling records three Bach organ works inside the Gedächtniskirche, Stuttgart Germany using the DN-023RA. Between 1974 and 1977, over 250 PCM recordings were made by Denon, the majority recorded in Japan.
- May 1975: University of Utah professor Thomas Stockham develops a PCM digital audio recorder of his own design, using computer tape drives as the storage system. He founds the company Soundstream to offer it commercially. Between 1977 and 1980 a total of eighteen 4-channel 50 kHz 16-bit units were manufactured, of which seven were sold at about US$150,000 (equivalent to $876,531 in 2024) each. Over 200 recordings were made on his equipment, almost as many as the Denon PCM.
- 1976: The prototype Soundstream 37.5 kHz, 16-bit, 2-channel recorder is used to record the Santa Fe Opera performing Virgil Thomson's opera The Mother of Us All for New World Records, making it the first US digital recording. However, the digital recorder is just a backup to the main analog multi-track recorder, and the analog recording is deemed superior and thus used for the LP release. The backup digital tape was presented at the October 1976 AES Convention in New York, but never commercially released.
- January 1977: Denon develops a smaller fully-portable PCM recording system, the DN-034R. Like the DN-023R and DN-023RA it records 8 channels at 47.25 kHz on a 2-inch video tape recorder (VTR) running at 38.1 cm/s, but it uses 14 bits "with emphasis, making it equivalent to 15.5 bits," yielding 89 dB signal-to-noise ratio. It also allowed for overdubbing for the first time with the use of a second VTR, crucial for professional recording.
- September 1977: Sony introduces the PCM-1 Audio Unit ($4400 street price equivalent to $6,985 in 2019) (44.056 kHz, 14-bit), the first consumer PCM encoder. It required the use of a home video tape recorder for storage.
- November 4–7, 1977: 3M demonstrates a prototype 2-channel 50.4 kHz 16-bit digital recorder running on 1-inch tape at 45 ips at the New York AES Convention. As no true 16-bit converters were available, it combined separate 12-bit and 8-bit converters to create 16-bit performance.
- November 28, 1977: Denon brings their DN-034R to New York City's Sound Ideas Studios and records Archie Shepp's On Green Dolphin Street, making it America's first released digitally recorded commercial album. Five other jazz albums are recorded with the DN-034R in New York before it returns to Japan in December.
- February 1978: Soundstream's first commercial release, Diahann Carroll With the Duke Ellington Orchestra Under The Direction Of Mercer Ellington – A Tribute To Ethel Waters, is recorded.
- March 1978: Sony introduces the professional-grade PCM-1600 at a list price of US$40,000 (equivalent to $192,837 in 2024) used with an external U-matic tape drive, making digital recording commercially available to recording studios for the first time. PCM-1610 and PCM-1630 follow.
- April 4–5, 1978: Telarc uses Soundstream's PCM system to record Frederick Fennell and his Cleveland Symphonic Winds playing Gustav Holst's Suites for Military Band and George Frideric Handel's Music for the Royal Fireworks. When released on LP this became the first US-recorded digital classical release.
- June 2, 1978: Sound 80 studios in Minneapolis records the Saint Paul Chamber Orchestra performing Aaron Copland's Appalachian Spring. This session is set up as a direct-to-disc recording, with the prototype 3M 50.4 kHz digital recorder running in the background. There is some disagreement, but it appears the resulting LP record (Sound80 Records S80-DLR-101) was taken from the digital backup tapes rather than the direct-to-disc acetate. In 1984 the session is re-released on Compact Disc by ProArte. This recording was nominated for three Grammy Awards, winning "Best Chamber Music Performance" (1980), making it the first digital recording to win a Grammy.
- Early June 1978: Sound 80 records Flim and the BB's debut self-titled album as another direct to disc recording again with the experimental 3M recorder in the background. Again, the acetate is deemed not as good as the digital backup, so the digital master is used for the LP record (Sound80 Records S80-DLR-102). This makes it the first U.S. non-classical digital release. Within 6 months, the hand-built ("very bulky and finicky") 3M digital recorder is disassembled, rendering the non-standard master tape unplayable. Therefore, no Compact Disc release is possible. The compact disc release of the Saint Paul Chamber Orchestra, which used the same machine, is unexplained.
- March 8, 1979: The first prototype Compact Disc player is demonstrated by Philips in Eindhoven, Netherlands. Prototype CDs played on the unit were a pressing of Antonio Vivaldi's Le quattro stagioni played by Vittorio Negri and the Kammerorchester Berlin (Philips 9500 100, recorded analog 1976), and Joseph Haydn's String Quartet No. 31(?). A third prototype disc, on Archiv Produktion is pictured but the details are not legible. The text indicates it might be Franz Schubert's Unfinished Symphony. Herbert von Karajan and the Berlin Philharmonic's recording of Richard Strauss's Eine Alpensinfonie is also mentioned as a contender for earliest test pressing of a CD, but it was not recorded until December 1–3, 1980.
- July 11, 1979: The first U.S.-recorded digitally recorded LP of popular music (with vocals), Bop Till You Drop by guitarist Ry Cooder, was released by Warner Bros. Records. The album was recorded in Los Angeles on a 32-track digital machine built by the 3M corporation.
- August 27, 1979: Giorgio Moroder's E=MC² is released, the first electronic live-to-digital LP recorded on Soundstream PCM.
- September 4, 1979: Scoring begins for Star Trek The Motion Picture soundtrack, recorded to multitrack analog, mastered to digital stereo tape for LP release to coincide with film debut December 6, 1979.
- October 12, 1979: Fleetwood Mac's Tusk is released on LP. It, and Live, December 8, 1980, were mastered on the Soundstream PCM from analog multi-tracks.
- October 30, 1979: Stevie Wonder releases his soundtrack album, Journey Through "The Secret Life of Plants" recorded onto U-matic video tapes using a Sony PCM-1600 digital adapter, and assembled into album form with a digital editing controller.
- December 1, 1979: The Grammy Award-winning self-titled Christopher Cross album is released. Cross' album becomes the first digitally recorded album to chart (recorded on the 3M system) in the United States, eventually winning 5 Grammys. Digital recording is now mainstream.
- 1980: The Red Book standard (44.1 kHz, 16-bit) is established for Compact Disc Digital Audio.
- 1980: Mitsubishi Electric introduces the X-80 ProDigi open reel 1/4" tape 15 ips 50.4 kHz 16-bit digital recorder ($5000 equivalent to $19,081 in 2024). Only 200 are sold worldwide.
- 1980: Soundstream merges with Digital Recording Corporation, becoming DRC/Soundstream, to develop and market 50 kHz PCM recording to an optical card. This is subsequently eclipsed by the rise of the 44.1 kHz Compact Disc and the company is out of business after 1983.
- 1981: Sony releases the PCM-F1 Digital Audio Processor ($1900 equivalent to $6,571 in 2024) (44.056 kHz, 16-bit) and matching SL-2000 Betamax VCR ($700 equivalent to $2,421 in 2024) as a complete affordable portable (with optional batteries) home digital recording system
- 1981: Technics releases the SV-P100 digital audio recorder suitable for both professional (digital mastering) and consumer (home use) recording. It used PCM 14-bit recording on a VHS format cassette tape, resulting in an up to 3 hours programme of 2-channel stereo recording.
- 1982: Sony releases the PCM-501ES PCM adaptor (44.1 kHz, 16-bit) ($895 list price), which is used with an external VHS or Betamax video recorder.
- 1982: Sony introduces Digital Audio Stationary Head standard (DASH) for digital audio recording on 1/4" open reel tape. Recorders supporting variations of DASH were as well produced by Studer and TASCAM.
- August 17, 1982: Claudio Arrau's March 1979 analog recording of Frederic Chopin waltzes (Philips 400 025) becomes the first classical Compact Disc ever commercially manufactured. It is made by the Philips plant in Langenhagen, Hanover Region Germany. Arrau himself was invited to press the button to start the manufacture. This CD was not actually released until 1983 so it presumably ran into manufacturing problems like the ABBA release (below).
- August 17, 1982: The first popular Compact Disc ever manufactured, ABBA's 1981 album The Visitors (selected because it was "mostly digitally recorded") is produced at the same plant. However, due to production problems with it the third version didn't actually hit stores until March 1983.
- September 5, 1982: Peter Gabriel releases his fourth studio album (titled Security in North America and Peter Gabriel IV elsewhere). When released on CD in October 1984 it becomes the first full-digital DDD release. It was recorded on Sony's Mobile One digital studio and mixed to a Sony PCM-1610.
- October 1, 1982: The first compact disc players are marketed by Sony (CDP-101, $900 equivalent to $2,932 in 2024) and Philips (CD-100, $700 equivalent to $2,281 in 2024).
- October 1, 1982: Billy Joel's analog-recorded 52nd Street becomes the first CD to hit the market in Japan, beating out ABBA's The Visitors and Claudio Arrau's Chopin Waltzes. Forty-nine other CDs are released in Japan on the same day including Toto's Turn Back, Pink Floyd's Wish You Were Here and Michael Jackson's Off the Wall.
- October 1982: New England Digital offers the Sample-to-Disk hard disk recorder option on the Synclavier, the first commercial hard disk recording system.
- November 26–28, 1982: Flim & the BB's record their second studio album, Tricycle. Released in early 1983, it became the first non-classical fully digital CD to be released. (Later given a SPARS code of DD).
- March 2, 1983: CD players and 16 CDs from CBS Records are introduced in the United States.
- September 1984: Bruce Springsteen's Born in the U.S.A. becomes the first US-manufactured CD to be released.
- 12 November 1984: American singer Madonna's second studio album Like a Virgin is released. It became the first digitally recorded album to top the Billboard 200 chart.
- 13 May 1985: English rock band Dire Straits' fifth studio album Brothers in Arms is released. It became the best-selling digitally recorded album of the 80s, and the first album whose CDs' sales outsold LPs'.
- 1987: Sony develops Digital Audio Tape (DAT).
- 1989: Test broadcasts for NICAM stereo digital audio for broadcast TV began in the UK.
- 1990: Digital radio begins in Canada, using the L-Band.
- 1991: Alesis Digital Audio Tape (ADAT) is a tape format used for simultaneously recording eight tracks of digital audio at once, onto Super VHS magnetic tape – a format similar to that used by consumer VCRs. The product was announced in January 1991 at the NAMM Show. The first ADAT recorders shipped over a year later in February or March 1992.
- 1992: Philips and Matsushita Electric introduce Digital Compact Cassette (DCC).
- 1992: Nagra launches manufacturing of its digital 1/4" open reel field recorders Nagra D and later a successor Nagra DII. “The Insider” starring Al Pacino and recorded by Lee Orloff using his two Nagra-D recorders was nominated for the Best Sound OSCAR at the 2000 Academy awards in March.
- September 1992: Sony announces its MiniDisc format.
- 1993: Random Access Digital Audio Recorder (RADAR) is the first single-box device used for simultaneously recording 24 tracks of digital audio at once, onto hard disk drives. The product, manufactured by Creation Technologies was announced in October 1993 at the AES Convention in New York. The first RADAR recorders shipped in August 1994.
- 1993: TASCAM develops Digital Tape Recording System (DTRS) for storing audio on Hi8 video cassettes.
- 1996: DVD players begin selling in Japan.
- 1999: Ricky Martin's "Livin' la Vida Loca" becomes the first No. 1 single to be recorded, edited, and mixed fully within a digital audio workstation. Produced by Charles Dye and Desmond Child using Pro Tools.

== Process ==
Recording

1. The analog signal is transmitted from the input device to an analog-to-digital converter (ADC).
2. The ADC converts this signal by repeatedly measuring the momentary level of the analog (audio) wave and then assigning a binary number with a given quantity of bits (word length) to each measurement point. The longer the word length, the more precise the representation of the original audio wave level.
3. The frequency at which the ADC measures the level of the analog wave is called the sample rate or sampling rate. The higher the sampling rate, the higher the upper audio frequency of the digitized audio signal.
4. The ADC outputs a sequence of digital audio samples that make up a continuous stream of 0s and 1s.
5. These binary numbers are stored on recording media such as magnetic tape, a hard drive, optical drive or in solid state memory.

Playback

1. The sequence of numbers is transmitted from storage into a digital-to-analog converter (DAC)
2. The DAC converts the numbers back to an analog signal by sticking together the level information stored in each digital sample, thus rebuilding the original analog waveform.
3. This signal is amplified and transmitted to the loudspeakers.

== Recording of bits ==
=== Techniques to record to commercial media ===
For digital cassettes, the tape head moves as well as the tape, typically in a helical scan configuration, in order to maintain a high enough speed to keep the bits at a manageable size.

For optical disc recording technologies such as CD-R, a laser is used to alter the optical properties of the dye layer of the medium. A weaker laser is used to read these patterns.

== Performance parameters ==
=== Word size ===
The number of bits used to represent an audio signal directly affects the resulting noise or distortion in a recording. (Note: Intentionally added dither in the recording process transforms quantization distortion into noise.)

=== Sample rate ===
As stated by the Nyquist–Shannon sampling theorem, to prevent aliasing, the audio signal must be sampled at a rate at least twice that of the highest frequency component in the signal. For music-quality audio, 44.1 and 48 kHz sampling rates are the most common.

Master recording may be done at a higher sampling rate (i.e., 88.2, 96, 176.4 or 192 kHz). High-resolution PCM recordings have been released on DVD-Audio (also known as DVD-A), DualDisc (utilizing the DVD-Audio layer), or High Fidelity Pure Audio on Blu-ray. In addition, it is possible to release a high-resolution recording as either an uncompressed WAV or lossless compressed FLAC file (usually at 24 bits) without down-converting it. There remains controversy about whether higher sampling rates provide any verifiable benefit to the consumer product.

When a Compact Disc (the CD Red Book standard is 44.1 kHz 16 bit) is to be made from a high-res recording, the recording must be down-converted to 44.1 kHz. This is done as part of the mastering process.

Beginning in the 1980s, music that was recorded, mixed or mastered digitally was often labeled using the SPARS code to describe which processes were analog and which were digital. Since digital recording has become near-ubiquitous, the SPARS codes are now rarely used.

=== Error rectification ===
One of the advantages of digital recording over analog recording is its resistance to errors. Once the signal is in the digital format, it is not subject to generation loss from copying. Instead of the gradual degradation experienced with analog media, digital media is subject to a cliff effect.

== Examples of digital recording devices ==
- Camcorder
- Data logger
- Dictation machine
- Digital video recorder

== See also ==
- Phone surveillance
