= PCM adaptor =

Encodes digital audio as video

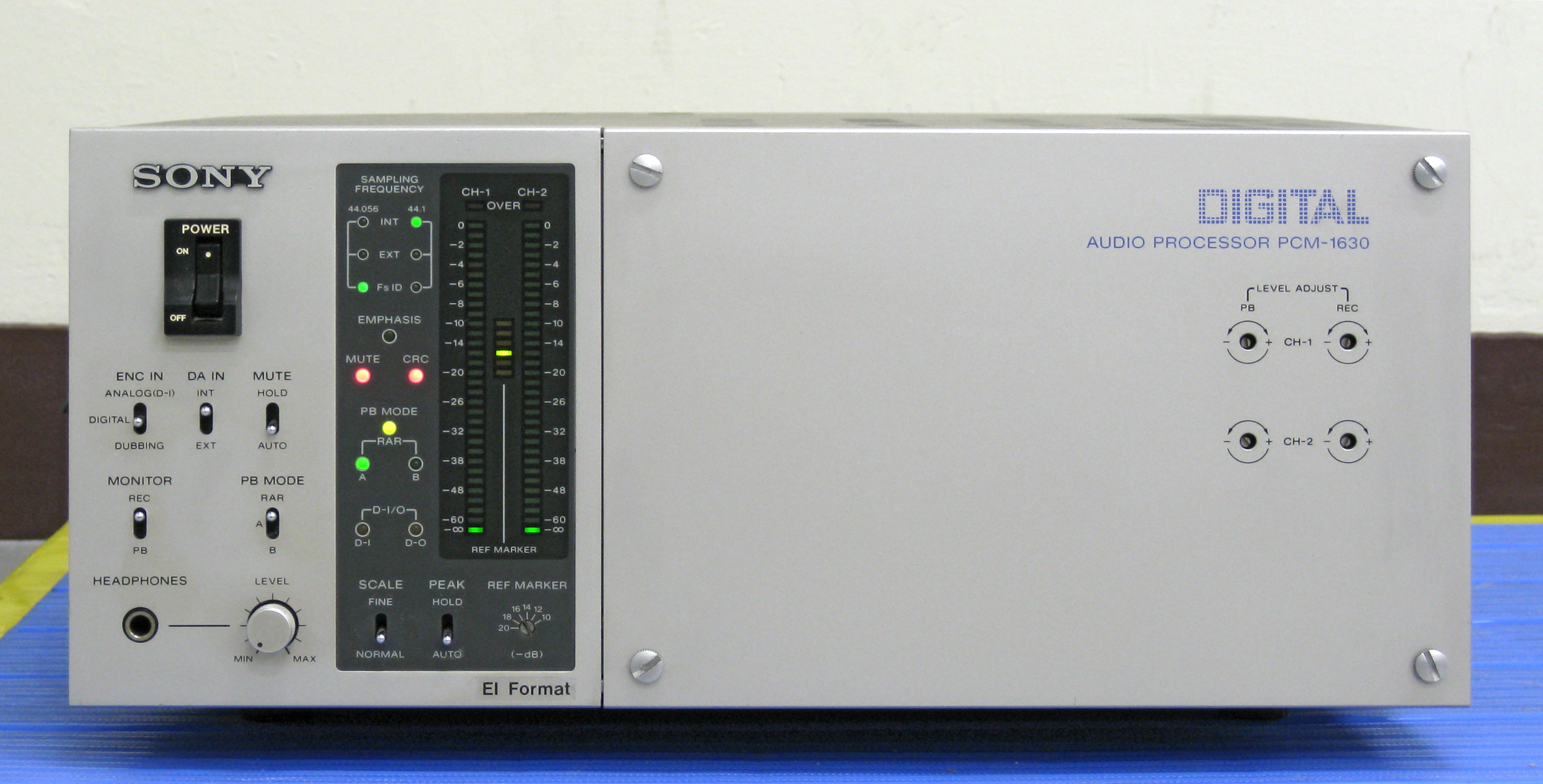
Sony PCM-1630

A PCM adaptor is a device that encodes digital audio as a video signal for recording on a videocassette recorder. The adapter also has the ability to decode a video signal back to digital audio for playback. This digital audio system was used for mastering early compact discs.

== Operation ==
High-quality pulse-code modulation (PCM) audio requires a significantly larger bandwidth than a regular analog audio signal. For example, a 16-bit PCM signal requires an analog bandwidth of about 1-1.5 MHz compared to about 15-20 kHz of analog bandwidth required for an analog audio signal. A standard analog audio recorder cannot meet this requirement. One solution arrived at in the early 1980s was to use a videotape recorder, which is capable of recording signals with higher bandwidths.

A means of converting digital audio into a video format was necessary. Such an audio recording system includes two devices: the PCM adaptor, which converts audio into pseudo-video, and the videocassette recorder. A PCM adaptor performs an analog-to-digital conversion producing series of binary digits, which, in turn, is coded and modulated into a black and white video signal, appearing as a vibrating checkerboard pattern, which can then be recorded as a video signal.

Most video-based PCM adaptors record audio at 14 or 16 bits per sample, with a sampling frequency of 44.1 kHz for PAL or monochrome NTSC, or 44.056 kHz for color NTSC. Some of the earlier models, such as the Sony PCM-100, recorded 16 bits per sample, but used only 14 of the bits for the audio, with the remaining 2 bits used for error correction for the case of dropouts or other anomalies being present on the videotape.

=== Sampling frequency ===
The use of video for the PCM adapter helps to explain the choice of sampling frequency for the CD, because the number of video lines, frame rate and bits per line end up dictating the sampling frequency one can achieve. A sampling frequency of 44.1 kHz was thus adopted for the compact disc, as at the time, there was no other practical way of storing digital audio than by using a PCM adaptor and videocassette recorder combination.

It is simplest if the same number of lines are used in each field, and, crucially, it was decided to adopt a sample rate that could be used on both PAL and monochrome NTSC equipment. Since monochrome NTSC has a field rate of 60 Hz, and PAL has a field rate of 50 Hz, their least common multiple is 300 Hz, and with 3 samples per line, this yields a sample rate that is a multiple of 900 Hz. For monochrome NTSC the sample rate is 5m × 60 × 3, where 5m is the number of active lines per field, which must be a multiple of 5 (the rest used for synchronization), and for PAL the sample rate is 6n × 50 × 3, where 6n is the number of active lines per field, which must be a multiple of 6. The sampling rates that satisfy these requirements – at least 40 kHz (to encode up to 20 kHz sounds), no more than 46.875 kHz (requiring no more than 3 samples per line in PAL), and a multiple of 900 Hz (to allow encoding in both NTSC and PAL), are thus 40.5, 41.4, 42.3, 43.2, 44.1, 45, 45.9, and 46.8 kHz. The lower ones are eliminated due to low-pass filters requiring a transition band, while the higher ones are eliminated due to some lines being required for vertical blanking interval; 44.1 kHz was the higher usable rate, and was eventually chosen.

The sampling frequencies of 44.1 and 44.056 kHz were thus the result of a need for compatibility with the 25-frame (PAL countries) and 30-frame black and white (NTSC countries) video formats used for audio storage at the time.

=== Video format ===
Audio samples are recorded as if they were on the lines of a raster scan of video, as follows: analog video standards represent video at a field rate of 60 Hz (NTSC, North America – or 60/1.001 Hz ≈ 59.94 Hz for color NTSC) or 50 Hz (PAL, Europe), which corresponds to a frame rate of 30 frames per second (frame/s) or 25 frame/s – each field is half the lines of an interlaced image (alternating the odd lines and the even lines). Each of these fields is in turn composed of lines – a frame of 625 lines for PAL and 525 lines for NTSC, though some of the lines are actually for synchronizing the signal, and a field comprises half the visible lines in one vertical scan. Digital audio samples are then encoded along each line, thus allowing reuse of the existing synchronization circuitry – as video, the resulting images look like lines of binary black and white (rather, gray) dots along each scan line. The line frequency (lines per second) was 15,625 Hz for PAL (625 × 50/2), 15,750 Hz for 60 Hz (monochrome) NTSC (525 × 60/2), and 15,750/1.001 Hz (approximately 15,734.26 Hz) for 59.94 (color) NTSC, and thus to record audio at the required over 40 kHz required encoding multiple samples per line, with 3 samples per line being sufficient, yielding up to 15,625 × 3 = 46,875 for PAL and 15,750 × 3 = 47,250 for NTSC. It is desirable to minimize the number of samples per line, so that each sample can have more space devoted to it, thus making it easier to have a higher bit depth (16 bits, rather than 14 or 12 bits, say) and better error tolerance, and in practice, the signal was stereo, requiring 3 × 2 = 6 samples per line. However, some of these lines are devoted to (vertical) synchronization: specifically, the lines during the vertical blanking interval (VBI) could not be used, so a maximum of 490 lines per frame (245 lines per field) could be used in NTSC, and about 588 lines per frame (294 lines per field) on PAL (Note that, in video, PAL has (up to) 575 visible lines while NTSC has up to 485).

== Models ==
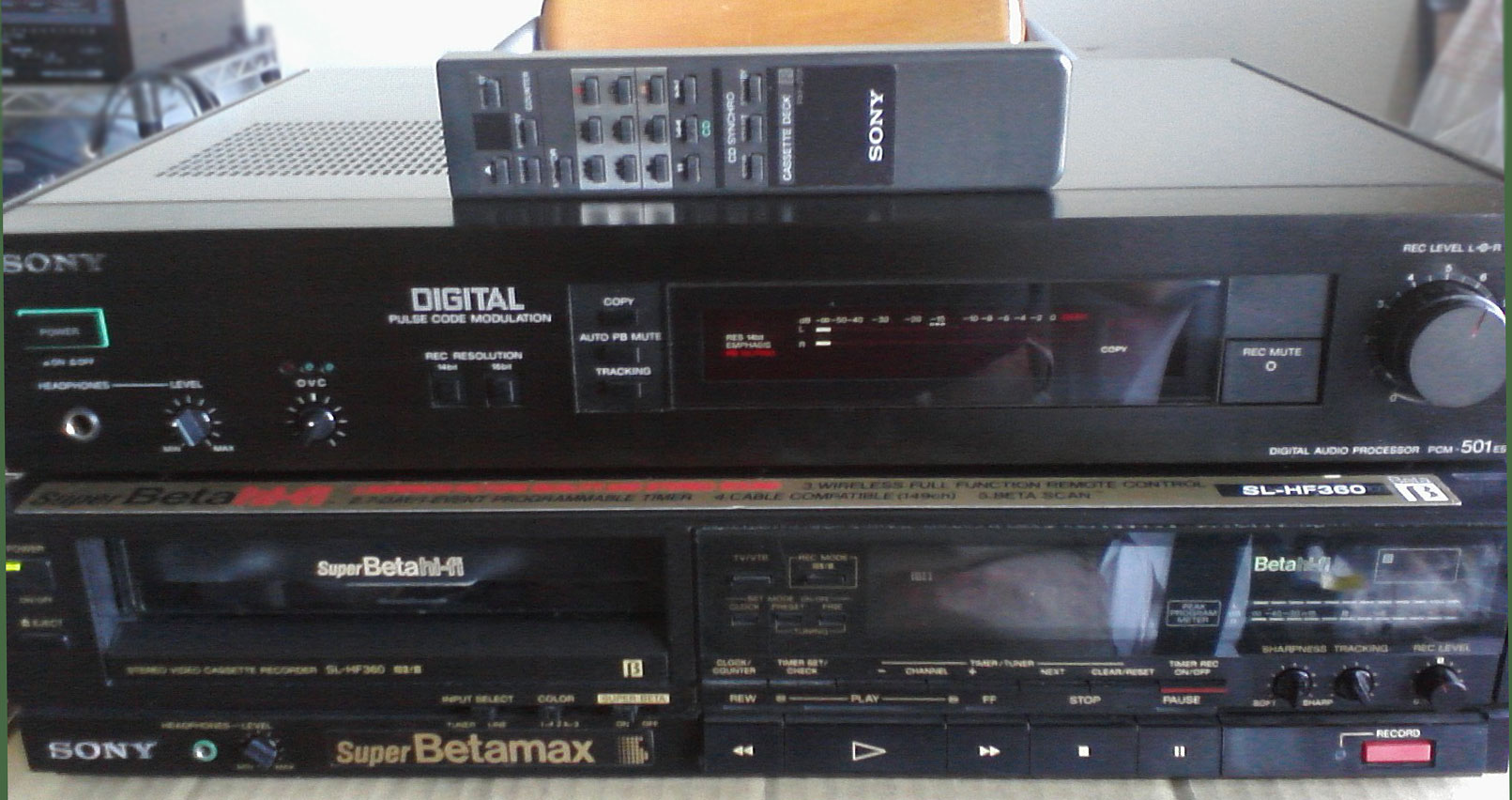
A Sony PCM-501ES EIAJ LPCM Adapter on a Sony SL-HF360 VTR

The Sony PCM-1600 was the first commercial video-based 16-bit recorder. The 1600 (and its later versions, the 1610 and 1630) used special U-matic-format VCRs also furnished by Sony for transports, such as the BVU-200B (the first model of VCR optimized to work, and sold with, the PCM-1600 in 1979), BVU-800DA, VO-5630DA, and the later DMR-2000 and DMR-4000, which were based on the industrial VO-5850 and the broadcast BVU-800 video machines respectively. These were all in essence modified versions of existing Sony U-Matic video recorders adapted for use with the 1600-series adaptors by way of disabling the chroma and dropout compensator circuits of the VCRs, which would hinder the proper recording of the monochrome-video-based digital audio data from the 1600-series adaptors if enabled. The BVU-200B packaged with the PCM-1600 also was modified to have its video head switching point moved to the vertical blanking interval of the digital-audio-bearing video signal being recorded to prevent errors or interference with the digital audio data. Editing was accomplished by using a 1600-series adaptor and two or more of these VCRs with a DAE-1100 or DAE-3000 editing controller. The 1600-series were the first systems used for mastering audio compact discs in the early 1980s by many major record labels, with the final U-matic 1600-format digital audio tapes being sent to CD pressing plants to be recorded to a glass master disc used for making the replicated CDs.

Several semi-professional/consumer models of PCM adaptors were also released by Sony:

- Sony PCM-1 (introduced in 1977)
- Sony PCM-10 (1979)
- Sony PCM-F1 (1982, the first consumer-marketed model which was sold with a companion Betamax-format VCR, the Sony SL-2000, SL-F1, or SL-F1E, for recording & playback)
- Sony PCM-701ES (1983)
- Sony PCM-501ES (1985)
- Sony PCM-553ESD/PCM-601ESD (1985, included S/PDIF digital audio input and output)

Technics also made a battery-powered portable PCM adaptor, the SV-100, a hi-fi component adapter, the SV-110, and a version with a built-in VHS videocassette transport, the SV-P100. All the Technics (Panasonic) PCM adapters are limited to 14-bit resolution. Other makes and models of PCM adaptors offered on the market were the Nakamichi DMP-100, the JVC VP-100, the Sharp RX-3, the Sansui PC-X1 and the Hitachi PCM-V300.

dbx, Inc. also manufactured a pseudo-video adaptor, the Model 700. It differed from the above-listed models in the fact that it did not use PCM, but rather delta-sigma modulation. This resulted in a higher quality digital recording with more dynamic range than what standard PCM modulation could offer. Like a standard PCM adaptor, the Model 700 also utilized a VCR for a transport.

== Obsolescence ==
In 1987, a few years after the PCM adaptor's introduction, Sony introduced a new cassette-based format for digital audio recording called Digital Audio Tape (DAT). Since DAT did not rely on a separate video cassette recorder, it was a much more portable and less-cumbersome format to use than a PCM adaptor-based system. DAT recorders had their own built-in transport using a small cassette unique to the format. DAT used tape 4 millimetres (0.16 in) in width loaded into a cassette 73 mm × 54 mm × 10.5 mm (2.87 in. x 2.12 in. x 0.41 in.) in size. The audio data was recorded to the tape by using helical scan recording, the same fashion that a VCR connected to a PCM adaptor would record to a videotape. In essence, DAT was a modernized, integrated, and miniaturized version of a PCM adaptor-based system.

Like a PCM adaptor, DAT could record only two tracks of audio at a time, but the smaller size of the equipment and media, as well as being able to accept multiple sampling rates and other flexibility, (Note: 44.1 kHz, 48 kHz and 32 kHz were supported, all at 16 bits per sample. A special LP recording mode using 12 bits per sample at 32 kHz gave extended recording time.) gave DAT many advantages over PCM adaptor-based systems.

Digital recorders capable of multi-track recording (Note: As opposed to only two tracks for stereo that a PCM adaptor or DAT could record.) such as Mitsubishi's ProDigi format and Sony's DASH format also became available on the professional audio market about the same time as the introduction of PCM adaptors. Other tape-based digital audio recording systems overcame problems that made typical analog recorders unable to meet the bandwidth (frequency range) demands of digital recording by a combination of higher tape speeds, narrower head gaps used in combination with metal-formulation tapes, and the spreading of data across multiple parallel tracks.

Despite obsolescence, hobbyists are still capable of using modern-day DVDs or Blu-ray discs as a transport medium for video-based encoding of digital audio streams.
