= Digital Audio Tape =

Digital audio cassette format developed by Sony

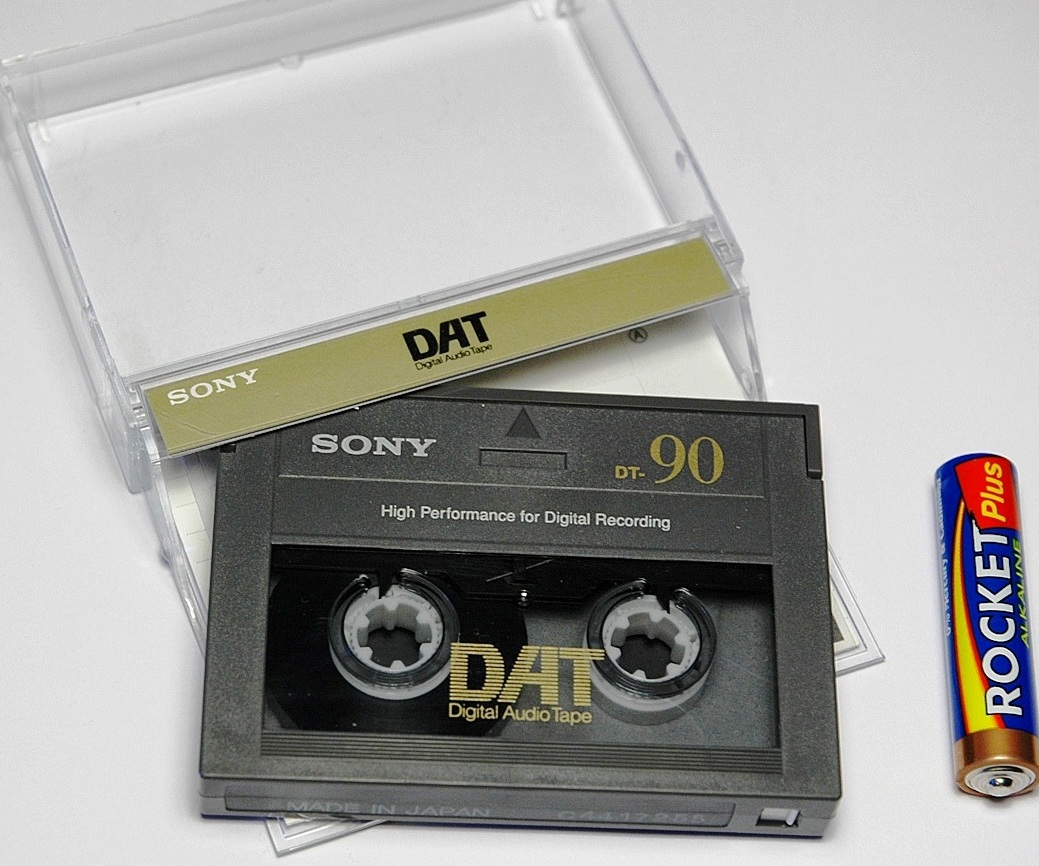
- A 90-minute DAT cartridge, with a AAA battery (LR03) for size comparison
- Media type: Magnetic cassette tape
- Encoding: Lossless real-time
- Capacity: Up to 120 or 180 minutes (consumer tapes on non-LP mode)
- Read mechanism: Rotating head, helical scan
- Write mechanism: Rotating head, helical scan
- Developed by: Sony
- Usage: Audio storage
- Extended to: Digital Data Storage
- Released: 1987; 39 years ago
- Discontinued: 2005; 21 years ago

Digital Audio Tape (DAT or R-DAT) is a discontinued digital recording and playback medium developed by Sony and introduced in 1987. In appearance it is similar to a Compact Cassette, using 3.81-millimetre (0.150 in), commonly referred to as four-millimetre, magnetic tape enclosed in a protective shell, but it is roughly half the size at 73 mm × 54 mm × 10.5 mm. The recording is digital rather than analog. DAT can record at sampling rates equal to, as well as higher and lower than, that of a CD (44.1, 48, and 32 kHz respectively) at 16 bits.

Similar to most formats of videocassette, a DAT cassette may only be recorded and played in one direction, unlike an analog compact audio cassette. Many DAT recorders had the capability to embed program numbers and IDs into the recording, which can be used to select an individual track, like on a CD player.

Although intended as a replacement for analog audio compact cassettes, the format was never widely adopted by consumers because of its expense, as well as concerns from the music industry about unauthorized high-quality copies. If a comparable digital source is copied without returning to the analogue domain, then the DAT will produce an exact clone, unlike other digital media such as Digital Compact Cassette or non-Hi-MD MiniDisc, both of which use a lossy data-reduction system.

The format saw moderate success in professional audio markets and for computing as the Digital Data Storage format for offline storage. Sony ceased production of new recorders, making it more difficult to play archived recordings in this format. Magnetic tape degradation has been noted by some engineers involved in re-mastering archival recordings on DAT, which presents a threat to audio held exclusively in this medium.

== History ==
=== Development ===
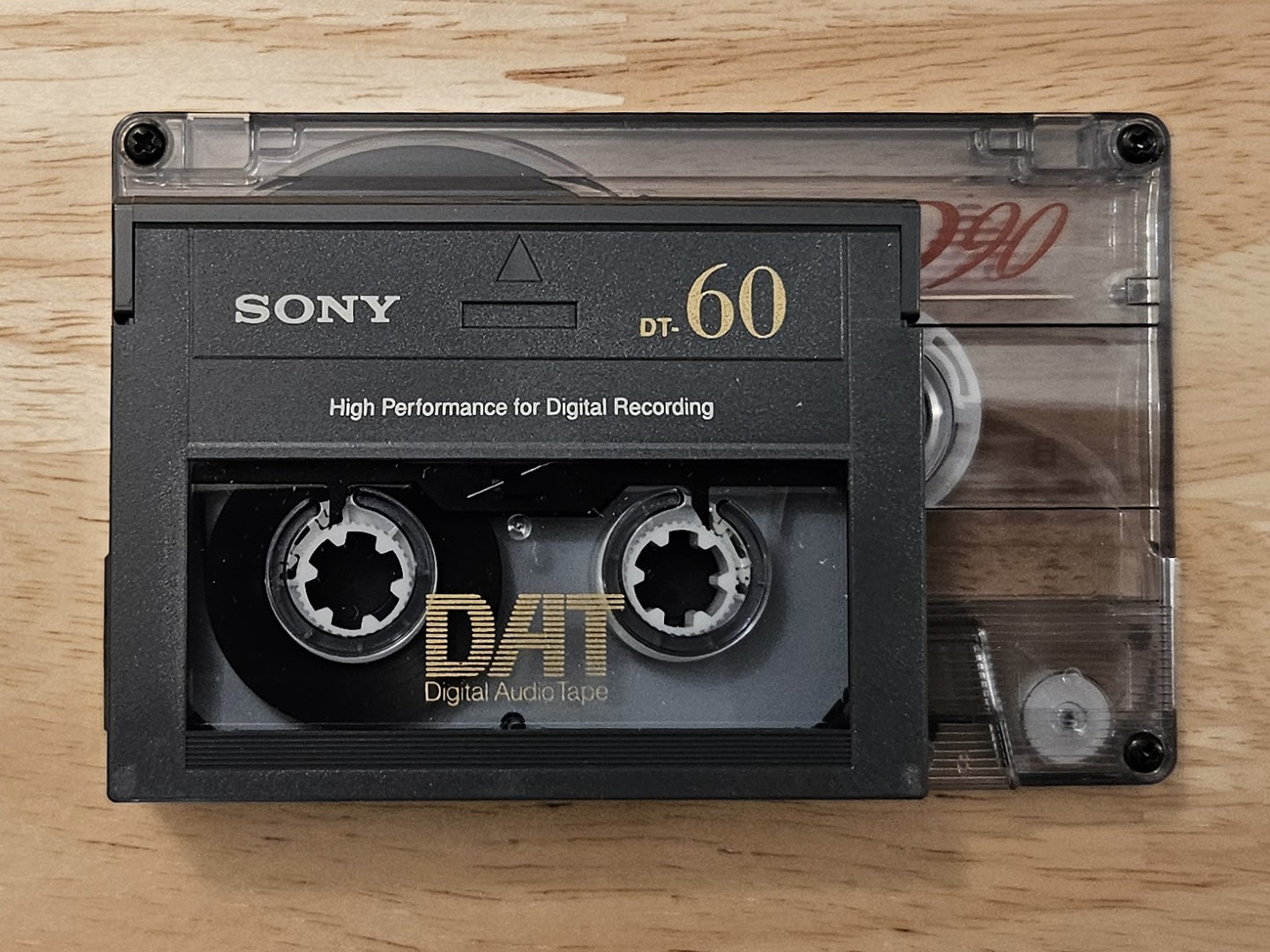
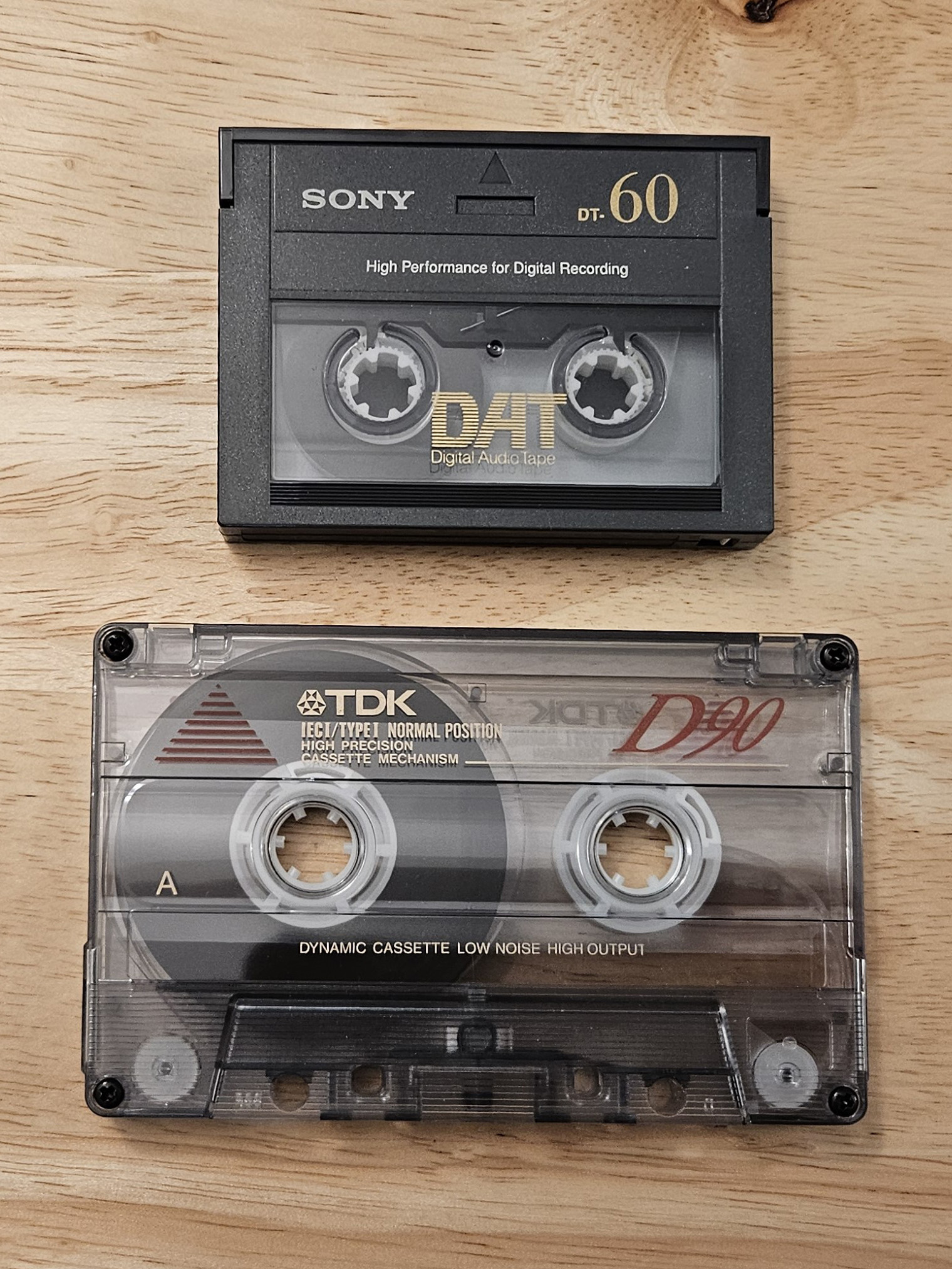
DAT compared to Compact Cassette

The basic tape mechanism of DAT is closely based on video recorders, using a rotating head and helical scan to record data. This prevents DATs from being physically edited in the cut-and-splice manner of analog tapes, or open-reel digital tapes like ProDigi or DASH. In 1983, a DAT meeting was established to unify the standards for recording digital audio on magnetic tape developed by each company and in 1985, two standards were created: R-DAT (Rotating Digital Audio Tape) using a rotary head and S-DAT (Stationary Digital Audio Tape) using a fixed head. The S-DAT format had a simple mechanism similar to the Compact Cassette format, but it was difficult to develop a fixed recording head for high-density recording, while the rotating head of the R-DAT had a proven track record in VCR formats like VHS & Betamax. As the S-DAT version was never released, R-DAT had been renamed as simply DAT by the time of its launch. However, Philips and Matsushita (Panasonic) would later release their own stationary head digital format in the form of the Digital Compact Cassette. Sony would later introduce another rotating head format in the form of NT, which was intended to replace the Microcassette and Mini-Cassette.

The DAT standard allows for four sampling modes: 32 kHz at 12 bits, and 32 kHz, 44.1 kHz or 48 kHz at 16 bits. Certain recorders operate outside the specification, allowing recording at 96 kHz and 24 bits (HHS). Some early machines aimed at the consumer market did not operate at 44.1 kHz when recording so they could not be used to 'clone' a compact disc. Since each recording standard uses the same tape, the quality of the sampling has a direct relation to the duration of the recording – 32 kHz at 12 bits will allow six hours of recording onto a three-hour tape while HHS will only give 90 minutes from the same tape. Included in the signal data are subcodes to indicate the start and end of tracks or to skip a section entirely; this allows for indexing and fast seeking. Two-channel stereo recording is supported under all sampling rates and bit depths, but the R-DAT standard does support 4-channel recording at 32 kHz.

DATs are between 15 and 180 minutes in length, a 120-minute tape being 60 metres in length. DATs longer than 60 metres tend to be problematic in DAT recorders due to the thinner media. DAT machines running at 48 kHz and 44.1 kHz sample rates transport the tape at 8.15 mm/s. DAT machines running at 32 kHz sample rate transport the tape at 4.075 mm/s.

=== Predecessor formats ===
DAT was not the first digital audio tape; pulse-code modulation (PCM) was used in Japan by Denon in 1972 for the mastering and production of analogue phonograph records, using a 2-inch Quadruplex-format videotape recorder for its transport, but this was not developed into a consumer product. Denon's development dated from its work with Japan's NHK Broadcasting; NHK developed the first high-fidelity PCM audio recorder in the late 1960s. Denon continued development of their PCM recorders that used professional video machines as the storage medium, eventually building 8-track units used for, among other productions, a series of jazz records made in New York in the late 1970s.

In 1976, another digital audio tape format was developed by Soundstream, using one inch (25.4 mm) wide reel-to-reel tape loaded on an instrumentation recorder manufactured by Honeywell acting as a transport, which in turn was connected to outboard digital audio encoding and decoding hardware of Soundstream's own design. Soundstream's format was improved through several prototypes and when it was developed to 50 kHz sampling rate at 16 bits, it was deemed good enough for professional classical recording by the company's first client, Telarc Records of Cleveland, Ohio. Telarc's April 1978 recording of Gustav Holst's Suites Nos. 1 & 2 for Military Band by Frederick Fennell and the Cleveland Wind Ensemble was a landmark release, and ushered in digital recording for America's classical music labels. Soundstream's system was also used by RCA.

Starting in 1978, 3M introduced its own line and format of digital audio tape recorders for use in a recording studio. One of the first prototypes of 3M's system was installed in the studios of Sound 80 in Minneapolis, Minnesota. This system was used in June 1978 to record Aaron Copland's "Appalachian Spring" by the St. Paul Chamber Orchestra conducted by Dennis Russell Davies. That record was the first Grammy-winning digital recording. The production version of the 3M Digital Mastering System was used in 1979 to record the first all-digital rock album, Ry Cooder's Bop Till You Drop, made at Warner Brothers Studio in California.

The first consumer-oriented PCM format used consumer video tape formats (Beta and VHS) as the storage medium. These systems used the EIAJ digital format, which sampled at 44.056 kHz at 14 bits. The Sony PCM-F1 system debuted in 1981, and Sony from the start offered the option of 16-bit wordlength. Other systems were marketed by Akai, JVC, Nakamichi and others. Panasonic, via its Technics division, briefly sold a digital recorder that combined an EIAJ digital adapter with a VHS video transport, the SV-P100. These machines were marketed by consumer electronics companies to consumers, but they were very pricey compared to cassette or even reel-to-reel decks of the time. They did catch on with the more budget-conscious professional recordists, and some boutique-label professional releases were recorded using these machines.

Starting in the early 1980s, professional systems using a PCM adaptor were also common as mastering formats. These systems digitized an analog audio signal and then encoded the resulting digital stream into an analog video signal so that a conventional VCR could be used as a storage medium.

One of the most significant examples of a PCM adaptor-based system was the Sony PCM-1600 digital audio mastering system, introduced in 1978. The PCM-1600 used a U-matic-format VCR for its transport, connected to external digital audio processing hardware. It (and its later versions such as the PCM-1610 and 1630) was widely used for the production and mastering of some of the first Digital Audio CDs in the early 1980s. Once CDs were commercially introduced in 1982, tapes recorded on the PCM-1600 were sent to the CD pressing plants to be used to make the glass master disc for CD replication.

Other examples include dbx, Inc.'s Model 700 system, which, similar to later Super Audio CDs, used a high sample-rate delta-sigma modulation rather than PCM; Decca's 1970s PCM system, which used a videotape recorder manufactured by IVC for a transport; and Mitsubishi's X-80 digital recorder, a 6.4 mm (1/4 in) open reel digital mastering format that used a very unusual sampling rate of 50.4 kHz.

For high-quality studio recording, all of these formats were effectively made obsolete in the early 1980s by two competing reel-to-reel formats with stationary heads: Sony's DASH format and Mitsubishi's continuation of the X-80 recorder, which was improved upon to become the ProDigi format. (In fact, one of the first ProDigi-format recorders, the Mitsubishi X-86C, was playback-compatible with tapes recorded on an X-80.) Both of these formats remained popular as an analog alternative until the early 1990s, when hard disk recorders rendered them obsolete.

=== Demise ===
Sony released its last DAT product with the DAT Walkman TCD-D100 in 1995 and continued to produce it until November 2005, when Sony announced that its remaining DAT machine models would be discontinued the following month. Sony had sold around 660,000 DAT products since its introduction in 1987. Sony continued to produce blank DAT tapes until 2015 when it announced it would cease production by the end of the year. Although it has been superseded by modern hard disk recording or memory card equipment, which offers much more flexibility and storage, Digital Data Storage tapes, which are broadly similar to DATs, apart from tape length and thickness on some variants, and are still manufactured today unlike DAT cassettes, are often used as substitutes in many situations.

=== Digital Compact Cassette ===
The DAT recorder mechanism was considerably more complex and expensive than an analogue cassette deck mechanism due to the rotary helical scan head, therefore Philips and Panasonic Corporation developed a rival digital tape recorder system with a stationary head based on the analogue compact cassette known as S-DAT. The Digital Compact Cassette (DCC) was cheaper and simpler mechanically than DAT, but did not make perfect digital copies as it used a lossy compression technique called PASC. (Lossy compression was necessary to reduce the data rate to a level that the DCC head could record successfully at the linear tape speed of 4.75 cm/s that the compact cassette system uses.) DCC was never a competitor to DAT in recording studios because DAT was already established, and studios favor lossless formats. As DCC was launched at the same time as Sony's Minidisc format (which has random access and editing features), it was not successful with consumers either. However, DCC proved that high-quality digital recording could be achieved with a cheap, simple mechanism using stationary heads.

== Anti-DAT lobbying ==
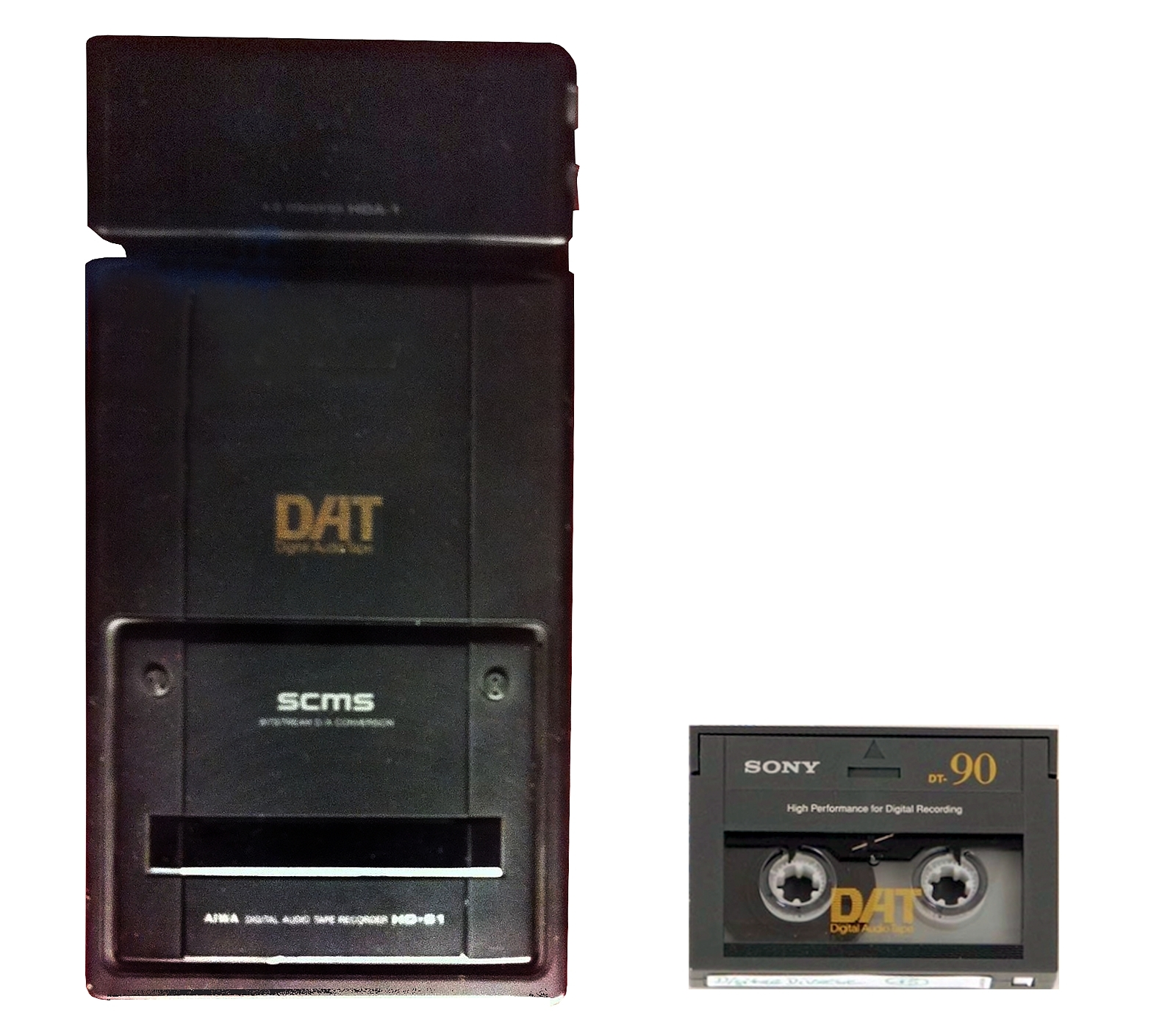
Aiwa HD-S1 portable DAT recorder from 1990 with DAT tape for size comparison. It is 146 mm high and 95 mm wide; the thickness is 38 mm.

In the late 1980s, the Recording Industry Association of America (RIAA) unsuccessfully lobbied against the introduction of DAT devices into the U.S. Initially, the organization threatened legal action against any manufacturer attempting to sell DAT machines in the country. It later sought to impose restrictions on DAT recorders to prevent them from being used to copy LPs, CDs, and prerecorded cassettes. One of these efforts, the Digital Audio Recorder Copycode Act of 1987 (introduced by Sen. Al Gore and Rep. Waxman), initiated by CBS Records president Walter Yetnikoff, involved a technology called CopyCode and required DAT machines to include a chip to detect attempts to copy material recorded with a notch filter, meaning that copyrighted prerecorded music, whether analog or digital, whether on LP, cassette, or DAT, would have distorted sound resulting from the notch filter applied by the publisher at the time of mastering for mass reproduction. A National Bureau of Standards study showed that not only were the effects plainly audible, but that it was not even effective at preventing copying.

This opposition by CBS softened after Sony, a DAT manufacturer, bought CBS Records in January 1988. By June 1989, an agreement was reached, and the only concession the RIAA would receive was a more practical recommendation from manufacturers to Congress that legislation be enacted to require that recorders have a Serial Copy Management System to prevent digital copying for more than a single generation. This requirement was enacted as part of the Audio Home Recording Act of 1992, which also imposed taxes on DAT recorders and blank media. However, the computer industry successfully lobbied to have personal computers exempted from that act, setting the stage for massive consumer copying of copyrighted material on materials like recordable CDs and by extension, filesharing systems such as Napster.

== Uses ==
=== Professional recording industry ===
DAT was used professionally in the 1990s by the audio recording industry as part of an emerging all-digital production chain also including digital multi-track recorders and digital mixing consoles that were used to create a fully digital recording. In this configuration, it is possible for the audio to remain digital from the first AD converter after the mic preamp until it is in a CD player.

=== Pre-recorded albums ===
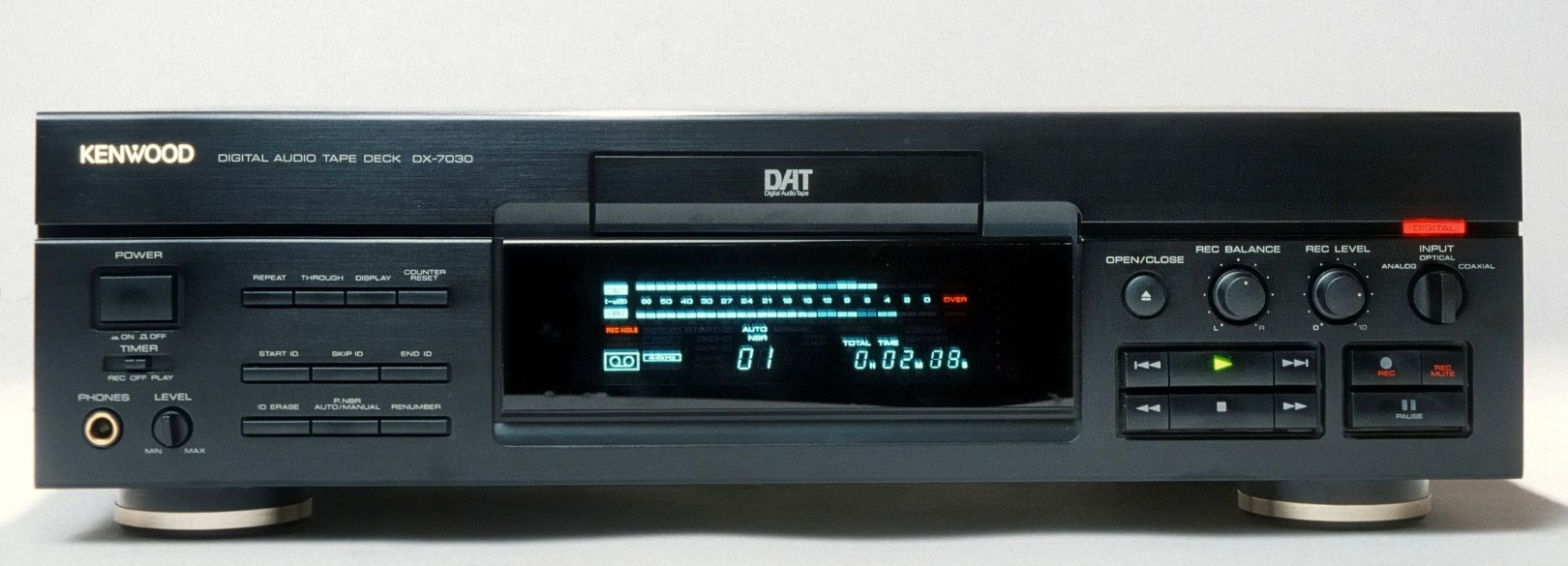
DAT recorder (Kenwood DX-7030)

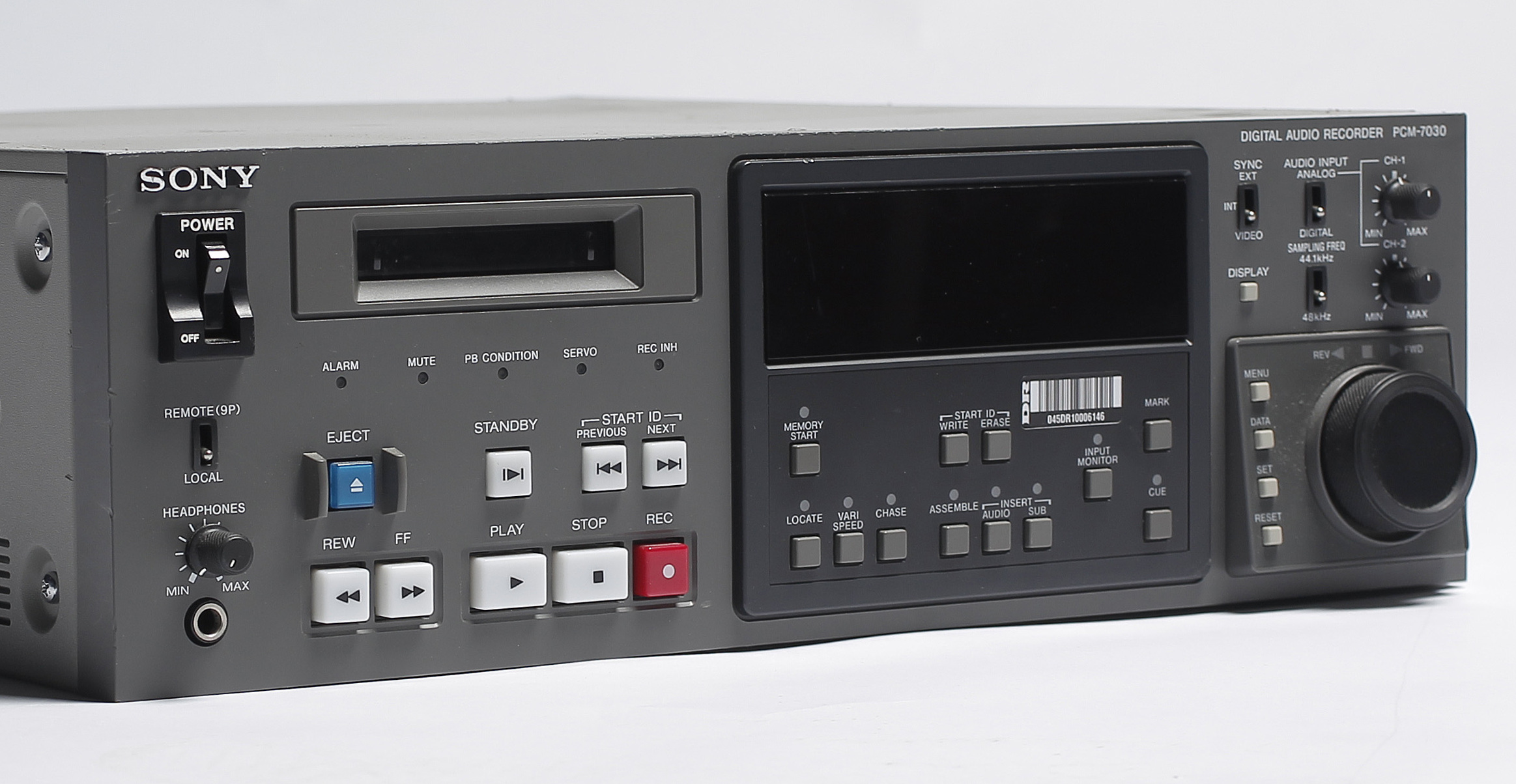
DAT was also used in professional environments like recording studios and broadcasting institutions. The depicted device is a professional Sony PCM-7030 DAT recorder, which had a recommended retail price of 8000 US dollars.

In December 1987, The Guitar and Other Machines by the British post-punk band The Durutti Column, became the first commercial release on DAT. Later in May 1988, Wire released their album The Ideal Copy on the format. Several other albums from multiple record labels were also released as pre-recorded DATs in the first few years of the format's existence, in small quantities as well. Factory Records released a small number of albums on the format, including New Order's best-selling compilation Substance 1987, but many planned releases were cancelled.

=== Amateur and home use ===
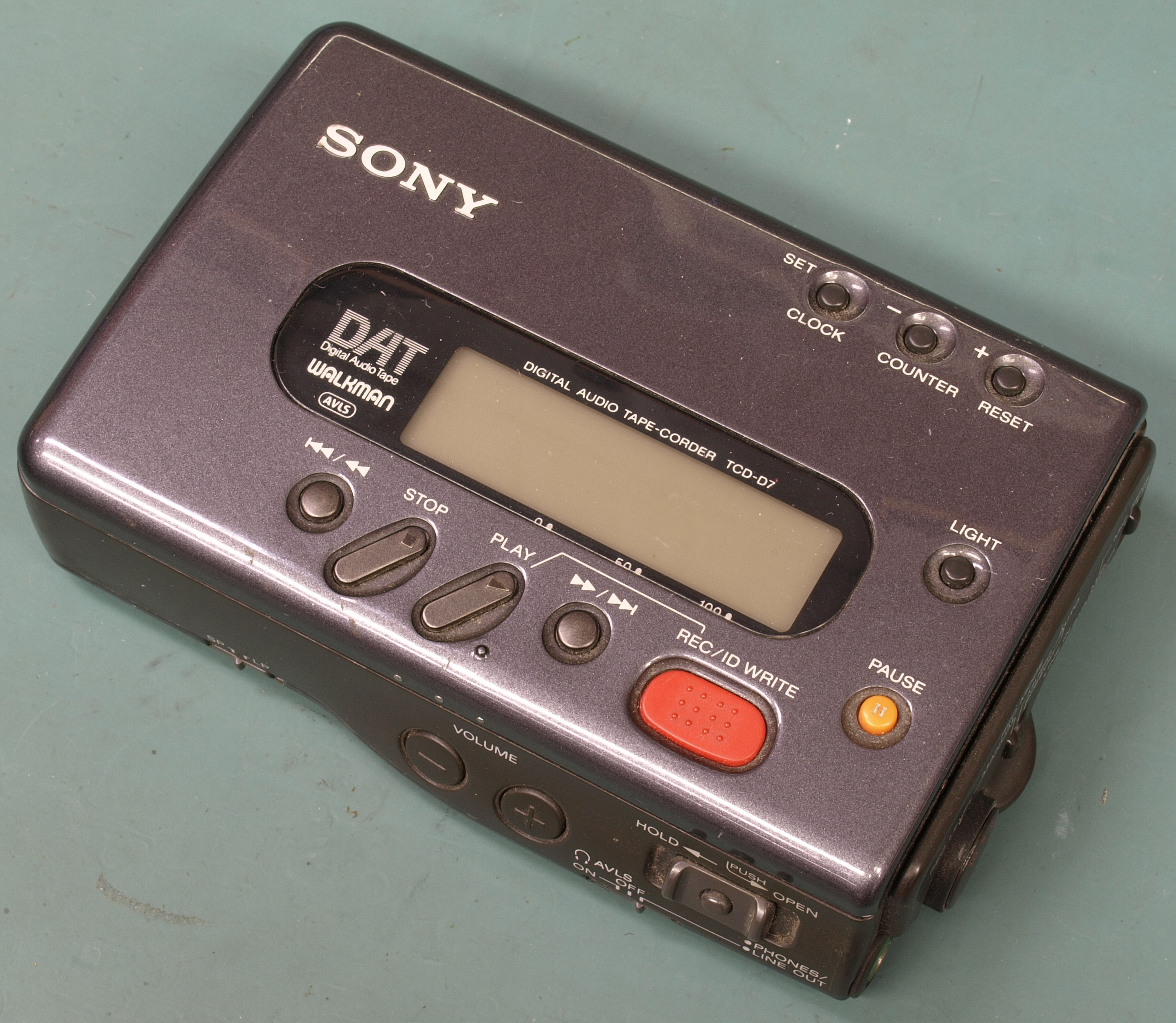
Sony DAT Walkman TCD-D7

DAT was envisaged by proponents as the successor format to analogue audio cassettes in the way that the compact disc was the successor to vinyl-based recordings. It sold well in Japan, where high-end consumer audio stores stocked DAT recorders and tapes into the 2010s, and second-hand stores generally continued to offer a wide selection of mint condition machines. However, there and in other nations, the technology was never as commercially popular as CD or cassette. DAT recorders proved to be comparatively expensive, and few commercial recordings were available. Globally, DAT remained popular, for a time, for making and trading recordings of live music (see bootleg recording), since available DAT recorders predated affordable CD recorders. In the 1990s, fans of jam bands, such as the Grateful Dead and Phish, recorded and stored high-quality audience recordings of live concerts on the format.

=== Computer data storage medium ===
The format was designed for audio use, but through the ISO Digital Data Storage standard was adopted for general data storage, storing from 1.3 to 80 GB on a 60- to 180-meter tape depending on the standard and compression. It is a sequential-access medium and was commonly used for backups. Due to the higher requirements for capacity and integrity in data backups, a computer-grade DAT was introduced, called DDS (Digital Data Storage). Although functionally similar to audio DATs, only a few DDS and DAT drives (in particular, those manufactured by Archive for SGI workstations) are capable of reading the audio data from a DAT cassette. SGI DDS4 drives no longer have audio support; SGI removed the feature due to "lack of demand".

== Digital video ==
Eight years before the introduction of the miniDV digital video format, Samsung had announced plans in early 1987 to release camcorders recording video onto DAT tape. The format would have been named "4 Vision", the first camcorder SVC41, with plans for an entire product line. Instead, no video products using DAT were ever produced serially.

== See also ==
- ADAT
- Digital Audio Stationary Head
- Digital Data Storage
- Digital Tape Recording System
- Digital Compact Cassette
- Magnetic storage
- Magnetic tape
- MiniDisc
- NT (cassette)
- PCM adaptor
- ProDigi
