= Digital Tape Recording System =

Digital audio media format

- Media type: Magnetic cassette tape
- Encoding: Lossless real-time
- Read mechanism: Rotating head
- Write mechanism: Rotating head, helical scan
- Developed by: TASCAM
- Usage: Professional digital audio
- Extended from: Hi8
- Released: 1993; 32 years ago

Digital Tape Recording System (DTRS) is a signal recording and playback medium developed by TASCAM, a division of the TEAC Corporation, that was stored on Hi8 video cassettes. It allowed up to 108 minutes of continuous digital multitrack recording on a single tape.

== Overview ==
The first device to use the format was the DA-88. This modular, digital multitrack device uses tape as the recording medium and could record up to eight tracks simultaneously. It also allowed multiple DA-88 devices to be combined to record 16 or more tracks. The first models in the series (the TASCAM DA-88, DA-38, DA-98 and Sony PCM-800) recorded at 16-bit resolution. TASCAM later introduced the DA-98HR and DA-78HR, which recorded at 24-bit resolution and sample rates up to 48 kHz (for DA-78HR) and 192 kHz (for DA-98HR, suitable for recording high-resolution audio).

In 1995, the TASCAM DA-88 won the Emmy award for technical excellence. The affordability and digital format of the DA-88 led to sales of more than 60,000 units by 1999. At that time, it was the biggest product in the history of TASCAM.Because of its reliability and durability, the DA-88 and its subsequent fellow units continue to be used by aficionados.

== See also ==
- TASCAM Digital Interface
- ADAT
- Digital Audio Stationary Head
- Multitrack recording
