= Digital Compact Cassette =

Digital audio recording format

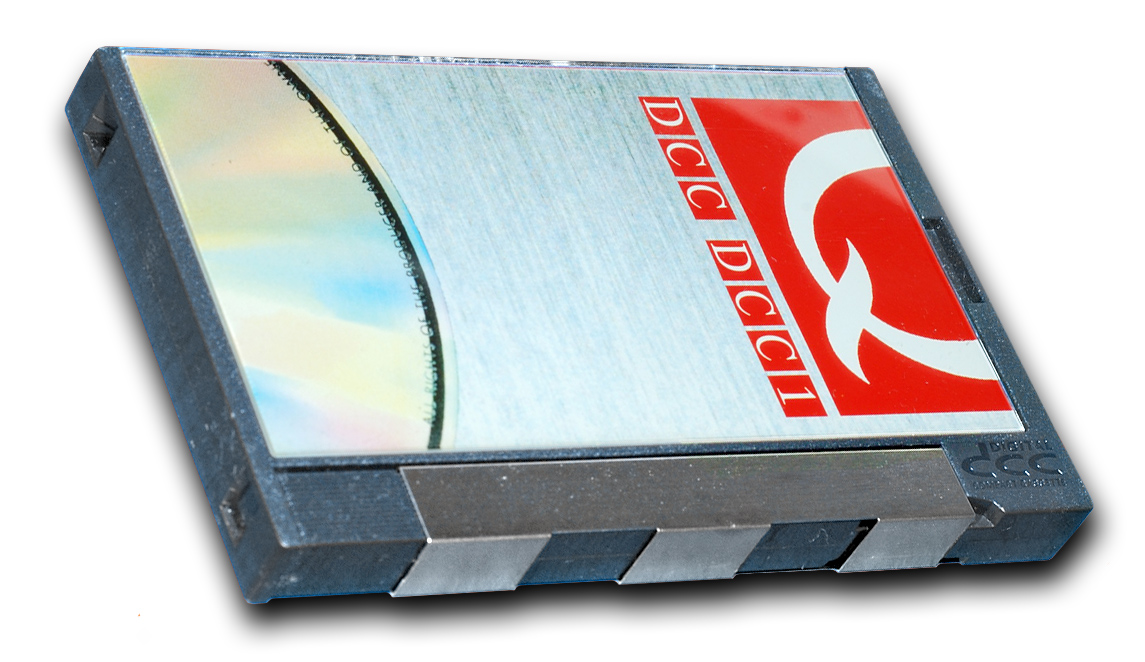
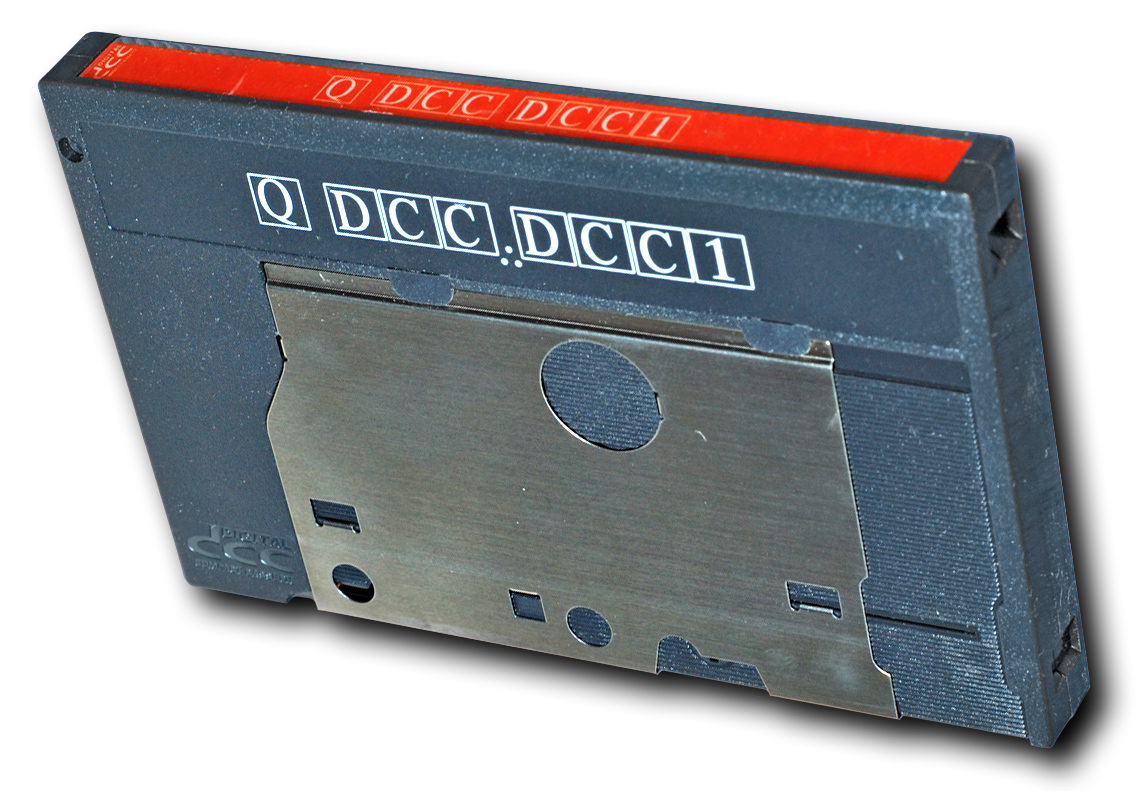
- A Digital Compact Cassette sent to the readers of Q magazine
- Media type: Magnetic cassette tape
- Encoding: Precision Adaptive Sub-band Coding (MPEG-1 Audio Layer I)
- Capacity: Theoretically 120 minutes; longest available tapes were 105 minutes
- Write mechanism: Multi-track stationary head
- Developed by: Philips, Matsushita Electric
- Usage: Digital audio
- Extended from: Compact Cassette
- Released: 1992; 34 years ago
- Discontinued: 1996; 30 years ago

Digital Compact Cassette (DCC) is a discontinued magnetic tape sound recording format introduced by Philips and Matsushita Electric in late 1992 and marketed as the successor to the standard analog Compact Cassette. It was also a direct competitor to Sony's MiniDisc (MD), but neither format toppled the then-ubiquitous analog cassette despite their technical superiority, and DCC was discontinued after four years in the marketplace. Another competing format, Digital Audio Tape (DAT), had by 1992 also failed to sell in large quantities to consumers, although it was popular as a professional digital audio storage format.

The DCC form factor is similar to the analog compact cassette (CC), and DCC recorders and players can play back either type: analog as well as DCC. This backward compatibility was intended to allow users to adopt digital recording without rendering their existing tape collections obsolete, but because DCC recorders couldn't record (only play back) analog cassettes, it effectively forced consumers to either replace their cassette deck with a DCC recorder and give up analog recording, or keep the existing cassette deck and make space to add the DCC recorder to their setup.

== History ==
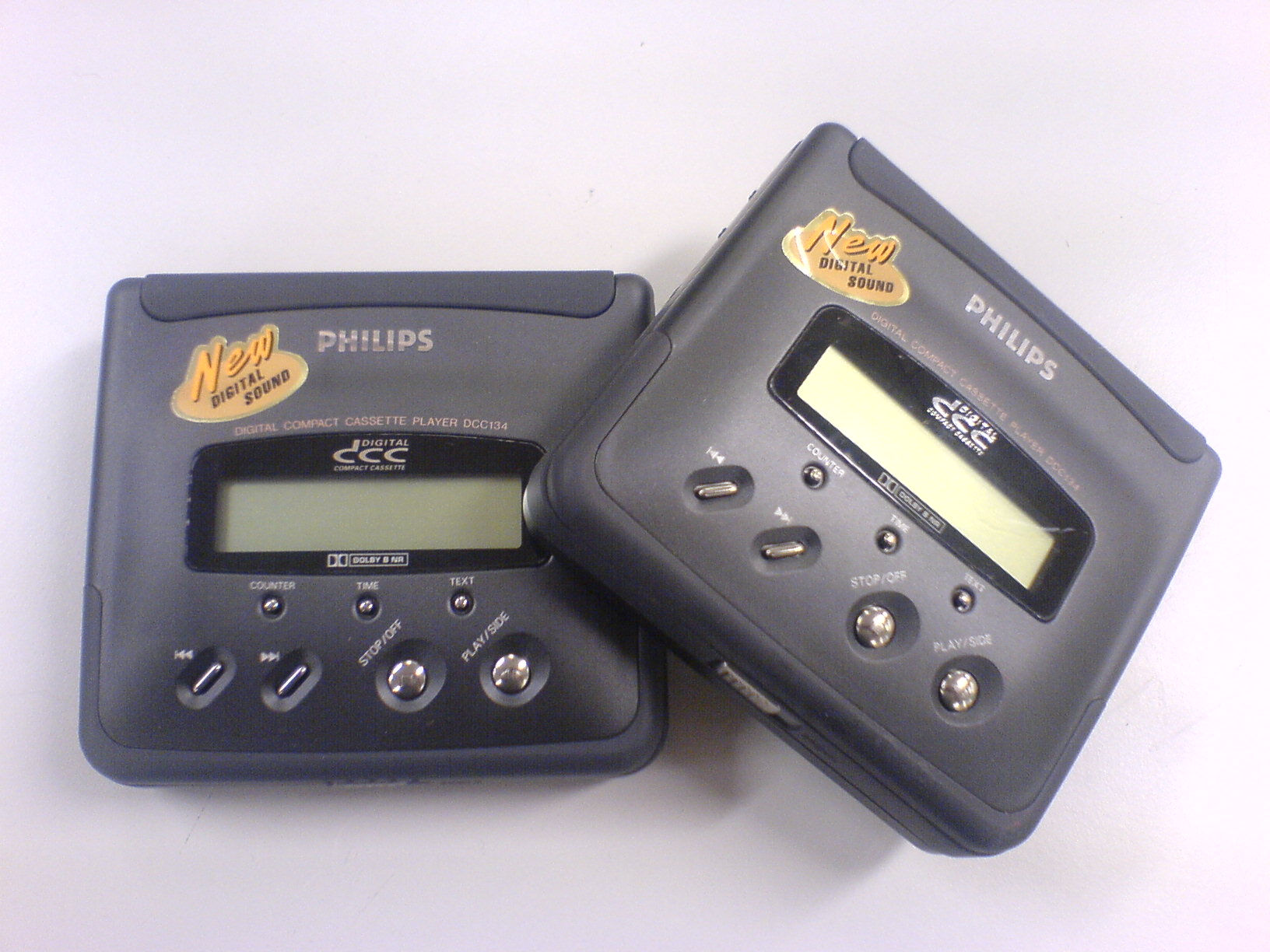
Philips DCC portable player

DCC signaled the parting of ways of Philips and Sony, which had previously worked together successfully on the audio CD, CD-ROM, and CD-i. The companies had also worked together on the Digital Audio Tape which was successful in professional environments, but was perceived as too expensive and fragile for consumers. Furthermore, the recording industry had been fighting against digital recording in court, resulting in the Audio Home Recording Act and SCMS.

Philips had developed the Compact Cassette in 1963 and allowed companies to use the format royalty-free, which made it hugely successful but not a significant money-maker. The company saw a market for a digital version of the cassette, and expected that the product would be popular if it could be made compatible with the analog cassette.

Around 1988, Philips participated in the Eureka 147 project that eventually produced the DAB standard. For this, it cooperated with the Institute for Perception Research of the Eindhoven University of Technology to create the PASC compression algorithm based on psychoacoustics.

On 8 October 1990, Philips made the first formal announcement of DCC. Tandy Corporation announced at the same time that it would distribute the recorders and tapes through its Tandy and RadioShack stores. It was expected at the time that DCC recorders would be available in the beginning of 1992 and would cost several hundred dollars less than DAT recorders. Even though this first announcement already used the term "digital compact cassette" (without capitalization), some publications around this time also referred to it as S-DAT (Stationary-Head Digital Audio Tape), to distinguish it from R-DAT (Rotary-Head Digital Audio Tape).

On 5 July 1991, Philips announced that it had joined forces with Matsushita to develop DCC.

The first DCC recorders were introduced at the CES in Chicago in May 1992 and at the Firato consumer electronics show in Amsterdam in September 1992. At that time, not only Philips and Technics (a brand of Matsushita) announced DCC recorders but also other brands such as Grundig and Marantz, which were both related to Philips at the time. Around the same time, Sony introduced the MiniDisc.

More recorders and players were introduced by Philips and other manufacturers in the following years, including some portable players and recorders as well as in-dash DCC/radio combinations for use in vehicles.

At the "HCC-dagen" computer fair in Utrecht, Netherlands, between 24 and 26 November 1995, Philips presented the DCC-175 portable recorder that can be connected to an IBM-compatible PC using the "PC-link" cable. This was the only DCC recorder that can be connected to, and controlled by a computer, and it was only ever available in the Netherlands.

Philips marketed the DCC format mostly in Europe, the United States and Japan. According to the newspaper article that announced the demise of DCC, DCC was more popular than MiniDisc in Europe, especially in the Netherlands.

DCC was quietly discontinued in October 1996 after Philips admitted it had failed at achieving any significant market penetration with the format, and unofficially conceded victory to Sony. However, the MiniDisc format had not done very well either; the price of both systems had been too high for the younger market, while audiophiles rejected MD and DCC because they felt the lossy compression degraded the audio quality too much.

== Technology ==
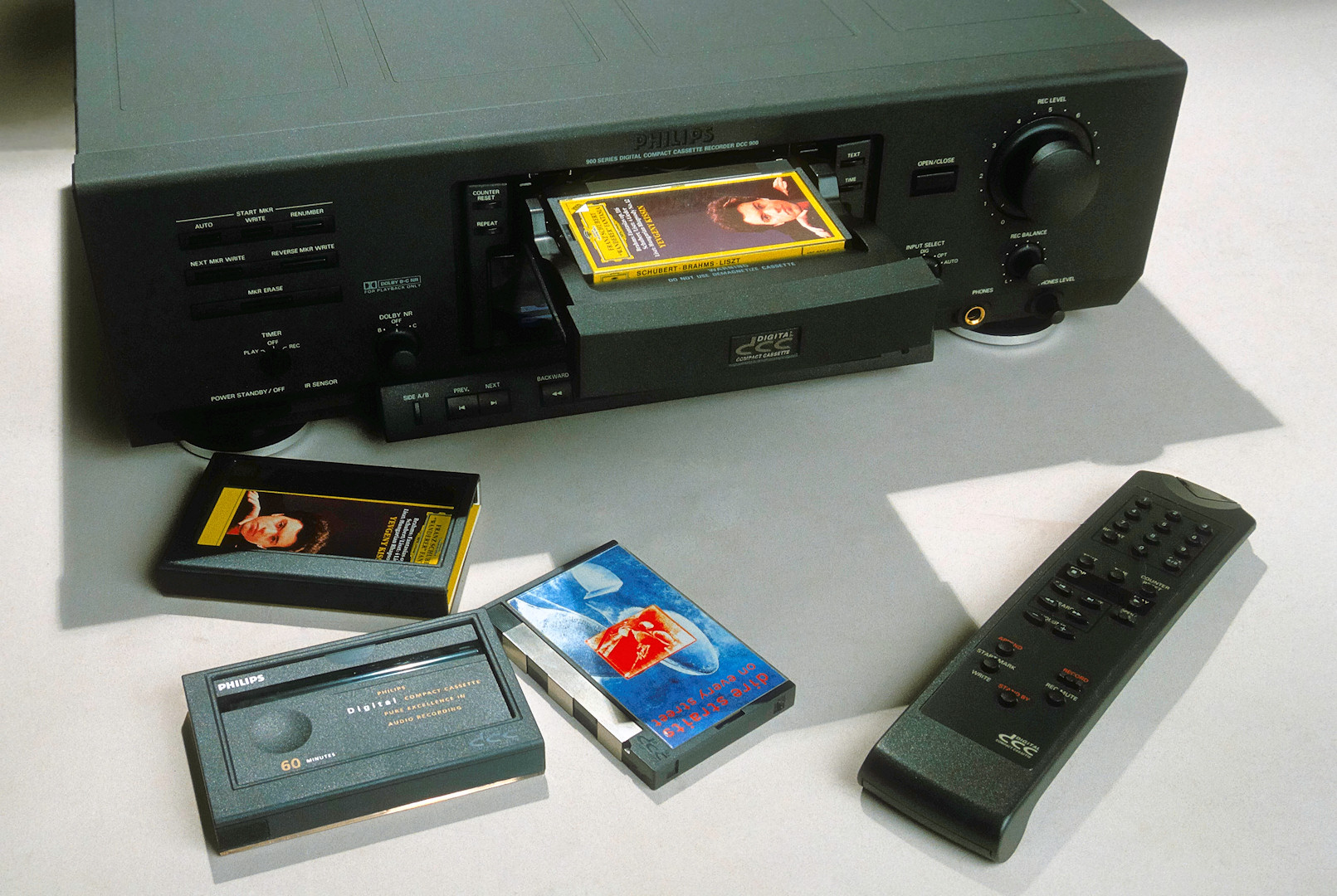
Hi-Fi-system-sized DCCs and recorder

=== Magneto-resistive stationary heads ===
Unlike helical scan systems such as DAT or VHS, the head is stationary and the tape moves in linear direction relative to the head. Like analog audio tapes, the heads use half of the tape width in each direction. There are nine tracks per side: eight tracks for the audio, and one track for auxiliary information. The track pitch is 195 μm. The head assembly has what Philips called "Fixed Azimuth Tape Guidance" (FATG) pins, which work together with the "Azimuth Locking Pins System" (ALPS) in the cassette to guide the tape.

DCC used magneto-resistive (MR) heads 70 μm wide for playback, and miniaturized coils 185 μm wide for recording. The heads were produced using photolithography. Some DCC head assemblies had separate MR heads to play analog tapes, others re-used two DCC heads to pick up the left and right analog audio tracks from the tape.

All DCC players and recorders are auto-reverse, so every player and recorder must have a way to position the heads for the A-side as well as the B-side of the tape. In stationary recorders, the mechanism switched sides by pivoting the head assembly 180 degrees (Philips used a modified version of an analog auto-reverse cassette deck during development, on which this mechanism was based), but in portable recorders and players, the head assemblies had heads for the tracks on both sides, which saved space in the mechanism, but made the head assembly more complicated:

- Pivoting head mechanisms in stationary recorders such as the DCC-900 used a head assembly that had nine (MR) playback heads and nine (coil) recording heads for DCC, plus two (MR) heads for playing analog compact cassettes. The head assembly was mounted on a pivoting mechanism that rotated the head assembly by 180 degrees when it switched from one side of the tape to the other.
- Playback-only portable players such as the DCC-130 and DCC-134 used head assemblies with 18 MR heads, nine for each side of the tape. When playing analog cassettes, two of the DCC MR heads were used to pick up the analog audio.
- Portable recorders such as the DCC-170 and DCC-175 used head assemblies with 18 MR heads for DCC playback, 18 coil heads for DCC recording, and 4 MR heads for analog playback (a total of 40 heads in one head assembly).

Magneto-resistive heads do not use iron so they do not build up residual magnetism. They never need to be demagnetized, and if a magnetic field from e.g. a cassette demagnetizer is applied to MR heads, it induces so much current into the heads that they are damaged or destroyed. Also, it is recommended never to use a cleaning cassette as DCC heads are fragile and this operation could ruin them permanently.

=== Tape specifications and PASC audio compression ===
DCC tape is the same 0.15 inches (3.8 mm) width as in analog compact cassettes, and operates at the same speed: 1 7/8 inches (4.8 cm) per second. The tape that was used in production cassettes was chromium dioxide- or cobalt-doped ferric oxide, 3–4 μm thick in a total tape thickness of 12 μm, identical to the tape that was widely in use for video tapes.

Nine heads are used to read/write half the width of the tape; the other half of the width are used for the B-side. Eight of these tracks contain audio data, the ninth track is used for auxiliary information such as song titles and track markers, as well as markers to make the player switch from side A to side B (with or without winding towards the end of the tape first) and end-of-tape markers.

The (theoretical) maximum capacity of a DCC tape is 120 minutes, compared to 3 hours for DAT; however, no 120-minute tapes were ever produced. Also, because of the time needed for the mechanism to switch direction, there is always a short interruption in the audio between the two sides of the tape. DCC recorders could record from digital sources that used the S/PDIF standard, at sample rates of 32 kHz, 44.1 kHz or 48 kHz, or they could record from analog sources at 44.1 kHz.

Because of the low tape speed, the achievable bit rate of DCC is limited. To compensate, DCC uses Precision Adaptive Sub-band Coding (PASC) for audio data compression. PASC was later integrated into the ISO/IEC 11172-3 standard as MPEG-1 Audio Layer I (MP1). Though MP1 allows various bit rates, PASC is fixed at 384 kilobits per second. The bandwidth of a CD recording of approximately 1.4 megabits per second is reduced to 384 kilobits per second, a compression ratio of around 3.68:1. The difference in quality between PASC and the 5:1 compression used by early versions of ATRAC in the original MiniDisc is largely a subjective matter.

After adding system information (such as emphasis settings, SCMS information, and time code) as well as adding Reed-Solomon error correction bits to the 384 kbit/s data stream, followed by 8b/10b encoding, the resulting bit rate on the eight main data tracks tape ends up being twice the rate of the original PASC data: 768 kbit/s, which is recorded onto the eight main data tracks at 96 kbit/s per track in an interleaved pattern. According to the Philips webpage, it is possible for a DCC player to recover all missing data from a tape, even if one of the 8 audio tracks is completely unreadable, or if all tracks are unreadable for 1.45 mm (about 0.03 seconds).

=== Auxiliary track ===
On prerecorded tapes, the information about album artist, album title, and track titles and lengths is recorded on the auxiliary ninth track continuously for the length of the entire tape. This made it possible for players to recognize immediately what the tape position is and how to get to any of the other tracks (including which side of the tape to turn to), as soon as a tape was inserted and playback was started, regardless of whether the tape was rewound before inserting or not.

On user tapes, a track marker was recorded at the beginning of every track, so that it was possible to skip and repeat tracks automatically. The markers were automatically recorded when a silence was detected during an analog recording, or when a track marker was received in the S/PDIF signal of a digital input source (this track marker is automatically generated by CD players). It was possible to remove these markers (to "merge tracks"), or add extra markers (to "split tracks") without rerecording the audio. Furthermore, it was possible to add markers afterwards that would signal the end of the tape or the end of the tape side, so that during playback, the player would stop the mechanism, fast-forward to the end of the A-side, or switch from the A-side to the B-side immediately.

On later generations of recorders, it was possible to enter title information for each track, which was recorded on the auxiliary track after the start-of-track marker. Because the title information was only stored in one place (unlike prerecorded tapes where users could see the names of all tracks on a tape) it was not possible to see tracks names of any other track than the one that is currently playing.

There are some minor compatibility problems with user-recorded titles; for example:

- On stationary recorders that had simple fourteen-segment displays, all track information had to be converted to upper-case because on those displays, showing lower-case characters is impossible. They were capable of displaying symbols that are impossible to enter with their own track information editors (such as the apostrophe).
- The Philips DCC-822/DCC-824 car stereo with DCC player had a full dot-matrix text display which could display upper-case and lower-case characters on prerecorded tapes as well as user-recorded tapes.
- Later-generation portable recorders DCC-170 and DCC-175 were capable of displaying text information from prerecorded tapes, but not from user-recorded tapes. The DCC-175 was capable of writing and reading the text information to/from a super-user tape via the PC, but does not show the user-recorded text information on the display.

=== "User tapes" and "super user tapes" ===
Some Philips documentation distinguishes between "user tapes" and "super user tapes". Super user tapes are tapes that have a continuously recorded stream of audio, with continuous absolute time codes relative to the start of the tape, and contiguously numbered tracks. In contrast, non-super user tapes may have one or more section that has no absolute time code and tracks that are unnumbered. The Renumber button that makes the recorder find all the track markers on a tape and makes sure that all track numbers are contiguous (which might not be the case if the user splits or merges tracks), only works on super-user tapes. Other than absolute time codes and track numbers that may become discontinuous or unavailable on a non-super user tape, it's impossible to distinguish between user tapes and super user tapes.

To make sure that the absolute time codes remain continuous (and the tape remains a super user tape), the user should start every recording at a point where absolute time codes are available. Some recorders have an APPEND button to find the end of the last recording automatically and prepare the recorder for the next recording. When recording mode is engaged (with or without the APPEND function), the electronics actually read the tape for a fraction of a second, to synchronize the internal absolute time counter with the time recorded on tape, and then start the actual recording at the beginning of a tape frame so that the resulting data stream has a continuous absolute time code.

=== Copy protection ===
All DCC recorders used the SCMS copy-protection system, which uses two bits in the S/PDIF digital audio stream and on tape to differentiate between protected vs. unprotected audio, and between original vs. copy:

- Recording digitally from a source marked "protected" and "original" (produced by a prerecorded DCC or MiniDisc, for example) was allowed, but the recorder will change the "original" bit to the "copy" state on the new tape to prevent copying of the copy. CDs do not have SCMS bits as the format predates this system. However, the recorder treats the absence of SCMS bits as "protected" and "original". Consequently the DCC recording cannot be further copied.
- Recording digitally from a source marked "unprotected" is also allowed; the "original/copy" marker is ignored. The "unprotected" bit is preserved in the copy.
- Recording digitally from a source marked "protected" and "copy" is not allowed: the record button will not work and any ongoing recordings will stop, and an error message is shown on the display.

Analog recording was not restricted: tapes recorded from analog source were marked "unprotected". The only limitation to analog recording on DCC as compared to that on DAT recorders is that the A/D converter was fixed to a sample frequency of 44.1 kHz. On the DCC-175 portable recorder it was possible to circumvent the SCMS protection by copying audio to the hard disk and then back to another tape, using the DCC Studio program.

=== Cassettes and cases ===
The DCC cassette and the case that Philips (but not some other cassette manufacturers) used were designed by Peter Doodson who also designed the CD jewel case.

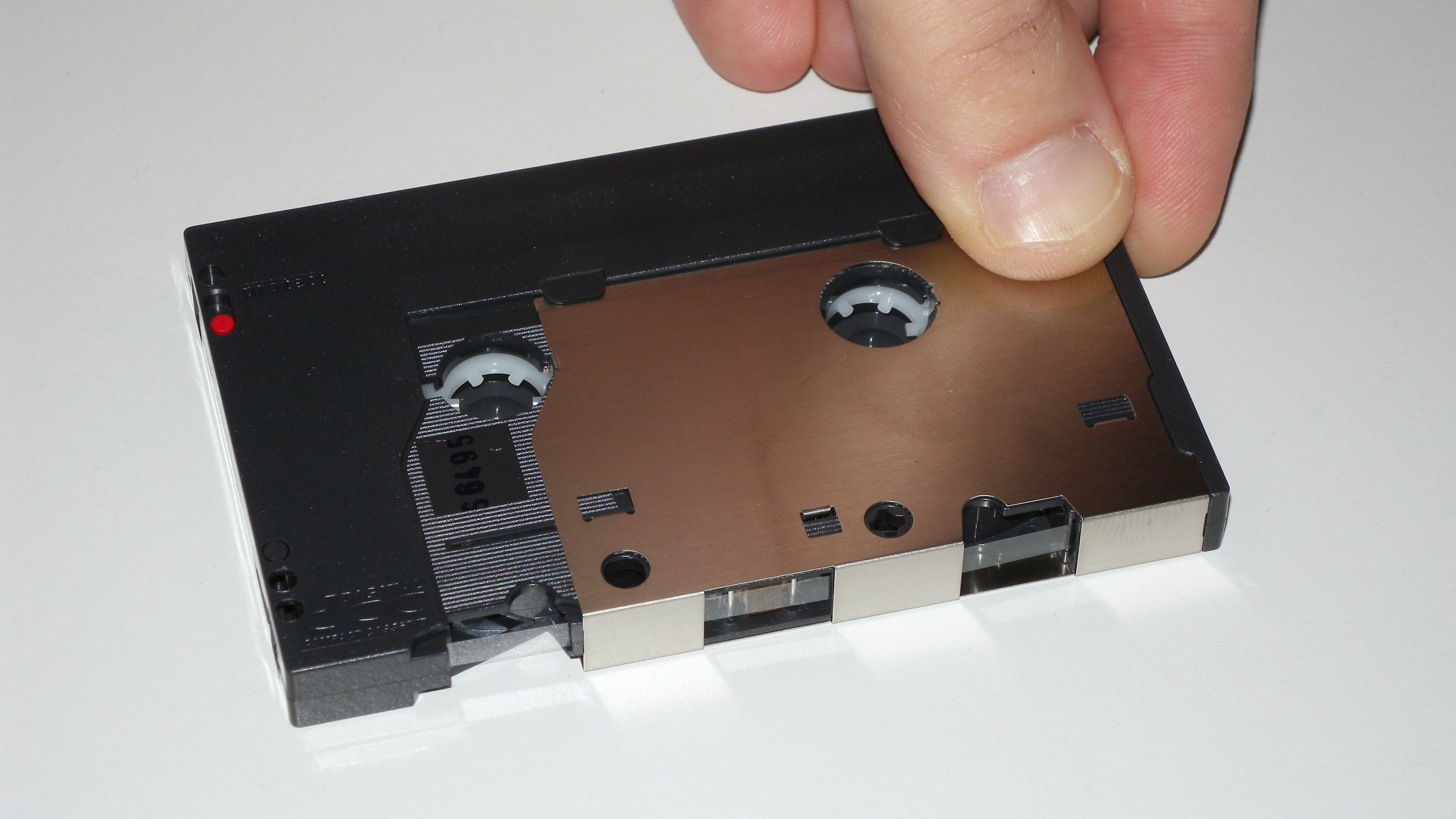
DCC with the shutter manually opened

DCCs are similar to analog compact cassettes, except that there are no "bulges" where the tape-access holes are located. DCC cassettes are flat and there are no access holes for the hubs on the top side (they are not required because auto-reverse is a standard feature on all DCC decks), so this side can be used for a larger label than can be used on an analog compact cassette. A spring-loaded metal shutter similar to the shutters on 3.5 inch floppy disks and MiniDiscs covers the tape access holes and locks the hubs while the cassette is not in use. Cassettes provide several extra holes and indentations so that DCC recorders can tell a DCC apart from an analog compact cassette, and so they can tell what the length of a DCC tape is. Also, there is a sliding write-protect tab on the DCC to enable and disable recording. Unlike the break-away notches on analog compact cassettes and VHS tapes, this tab makes it easier to make a tape recordable again, and unlike on analog compact cassettes, the marker protects the entire tape rather than just one side.

The cases that DCCs came in generally did not have the characteristic folding mechanism used for analog compact cassettes. Instead, DCC cases tended to be simple plastic boxes that were open on one of the short sides. The front side had a rectangular opening that exposed almost the entire cassette, so that any label on the cassette would be visible even when the cassette was in its case. This allowed the user to slide the cassette into and out of the case with one hand (which was seen as a major advantage for mobile use), and reduced production costs, especially for prerecorded cassettes, because the case did not need a separate label. Format partner Matsushita (now Panasonic) and others did, however, produce blank cassettes (under their Panasonic brand) with a clam-shell-style case. Because DCCs have no "bulges" near the tape access holes, there is more space in the case behind the cassette to insert, for example, a booklet for a prerecorded tape, or a folded up card on which users could write the contents of the tape. In spite of the differences, the outside measurements of the standard DCC cases were exactly identical to the cases of analog compact cassettes, so they could be used in existing storage systems. The Matsushita-designed clam-shell case was slightly thinner than an analog compact cassette case is.

=== Data recording ===
There is only one DCC recorder that has the capability of being connected to and controlled by a computer: the DCC-175. It is a portable recorder that was developed by Marantz in Japan (unlike most of the other Philips recorders which were developed in the Netherlands and Belgium), and looks very similar to the other portables available from Philips and Marantz at the time: the DCC-134 and the DCC-170. The DCC-175 was sold only in the Netherlands, and was available separately or in a package with the "PC-link" data cable which can be used to connect the recorder to a parallel port of an IBM-compatible PC. Only small quantities of both recorder and cable were made, leaving many people searching for one or both at the time of the demise of DCC.

The DCC-175 Service Manual shows that in the recorder, the cable is connected to the I²S bus that carries the PASC bitstream, and it is also connected to a dedicated serial port of the microcontroller, to allow the PC to control the mechanism and to read and write auxiliary information such as track markers and track titles. The parallel port connector of the cable contains a custom chip created especially for this purpose by Philips Key Modules, as well as a standard RAM chip. Philips made no detailed technical information available to the public about the custom chip and therefore it is impossible for people who own a DCC-175 but no PC-link cable to make their own version of the PC-link cable.

The PC-link cable package included software consisting of:

- DCC Backup for Windows, a backup program
- DCC Studio, a sound recorder and editor for Windows
- A DCC tape database program that works together with DCC Studio

Philips also provided a DOS backup application via their BBS, and later on they provided an upgrade to the DCC Studio software to fix some bugs and provide better compatibility with Windows 95 which had come out just before the release of the DCC-175. The software also works with Windows 98, Windows 98SE and Windows ME, but not with any later versions of Windows.

The backup programs for DOS as well as Windows does not support long file names which had been introduced by Windows 95 just a few months before the release. Also, because the tape runs at its usual speed and data rate, it takes 90 minutes to record approximately 250 megabytes of uncompressed data. Other backup media common in those days were faster, had more capacity, and supported long file names, so the DCC backup programs were relatively unhelpful for users.

The DCC Studio application, however, was a useful application that made it possible to copy audio from tape to hard disk and vice versa, regardless of the SCMS status of the tape. This made it possible to circumvent SCMS with DCC Studio. The program also allowed users to manipulate the PASC audio files that were recorded to hard disk in various ways: they could change equalization settings, cut/copy and paste track fragments, and place and move audio markers and name those audio markers from the PC keyboard. It was possible to record a mix tape by selecting the desired tracks from a list, and moving the tracks around in a playlist. Then the user could click on the record button to copy the entire playlist back to DCC tape, while simultaneously recording markers (such as reverse and end-of-tape) and track titles. It was not necessary to record the track titles and tape markers separately (as you would do with a stationary recorder), and thanks to the use of a PC keyboard, it was possible to use characters in song titles that were not available when using a stationary machine's remote control.

The DCC Studio program used the recorder as playback and recording device, avoiding the need for a separate sound card, an uncommon accessory at the time. Working with the PASC data directly without the need to compress and decompress, also saved a lot of hard disk space, and most computers at the time would have had a hard time compressing and decompressing PASC data in real time anyway. However, many users complained that they would have liked to have the possibility of using uncompressed WAV audio files with the DCC Studio program, and Philips responded by mailing a floppy disk to registered users, containing programs to convert a WAV file to PASC and vice versa. Unfortunately this software was extremely slow (it takes several hours to compress a few minutes of PCM music in a WAV file to PASC) but it was soon discovered that the PASC files are simply MPEG-1 Audio Layer I files that use an under-documented padding feature of the MPEG standard to make all frames the same length, so then it became easy to use other MPEG decoding software to convert PASC to PCM and vice versa.

== Derivatives ==
The technology of using stationary MR heads was later further developed by OnStream for use as a data storage media for computers. MR heads are now also commonly used in hard disks, although hard disks now use the giant magnetoresistance variant, whereas DCCs used the earlier anisotropic magnetoresistance.

A derivative technology developed originally for DCC is now being used for filtering beer. Silicon wafers with micrometer-scale holes are ideal for separating yeast particles from beer, as the beer flows through the silicon wafer leaving the yeast particles behind. This is desirable when the final beer is meant to be extremely clear. The manufacturing process for the filters was originally developed for the read/write heads of DCC decks.

== See also ==
- DVD – Digital optical disc data storage format
- Universal Media Disc – Optical disc medium for PlayStation Portable
