= Single-system recording =

Single system audio is the system of recording sound on film or SOF. There are two methods of recording, the older method, optical and the later method, magnetic. SOF was primarily used for news film prior to the advent of portable videotape recording, but was used until recently for documentary film recording.

== Optical ==
For optical recording, the film only had a single row of perforations and the area where the other set of perforations would have been was exposed to a small bright lamp inside the camera controlled by an amplifier (usually in a separate box) that would vary the area of recording (RCA type), by means of shutters pulled back by variation in current, or variations in intensity (Western Electric type). Editing involved painting or taping over the optical track for the distance the sound led the film through the camera and projector. This would avoid the popping sound, but would result in a second of silence.

== Magnetic ==
Magnetic recording had magnetic media in the area where the optical sound track would be recorded on optical SOF or on release prints. The principal recording stripe was approximately 2 mm wide. A smaller balance stripe existed to compensate the thickness of the recording stripe to keep the film wound evenly. Auricon and Cinema Products Corporation were two popular manufacturers of this type of camera, which were made obsolete by the takeover of video for news shooting in the late 70s.

The main problem with placing a magnetic stripe on film is that the tape head cannot block the projector gate and must be slightly offset, which means that sound and light cannot be recorded on the exact same piece of film. Any given frame will be as far as 24 frames ahead of the corresponding segment of the magnetic stripe. Editing such film by splicing it risks cutting off the current speaker's last syllable.

To edit single-system magnetic film, it was necessary to first run it through a displacement recorder which would read the audio and re-record it backwards 24 frames behind the point where it was recorded. This put the audio in dead sync with the picture. The film was then edited. After editing the film was run through the displacement recorder again, forward this time which put the audio back at the location where the audio playback head would be in the film projector. These additional levels of generation loss explain why the film industry has always preferred double-system recording for professional film projects.

== See also ==
- Double-system recording
