= ADAT =

Digital audio tape format

Alesis Digital Audio Tape (ADAT)

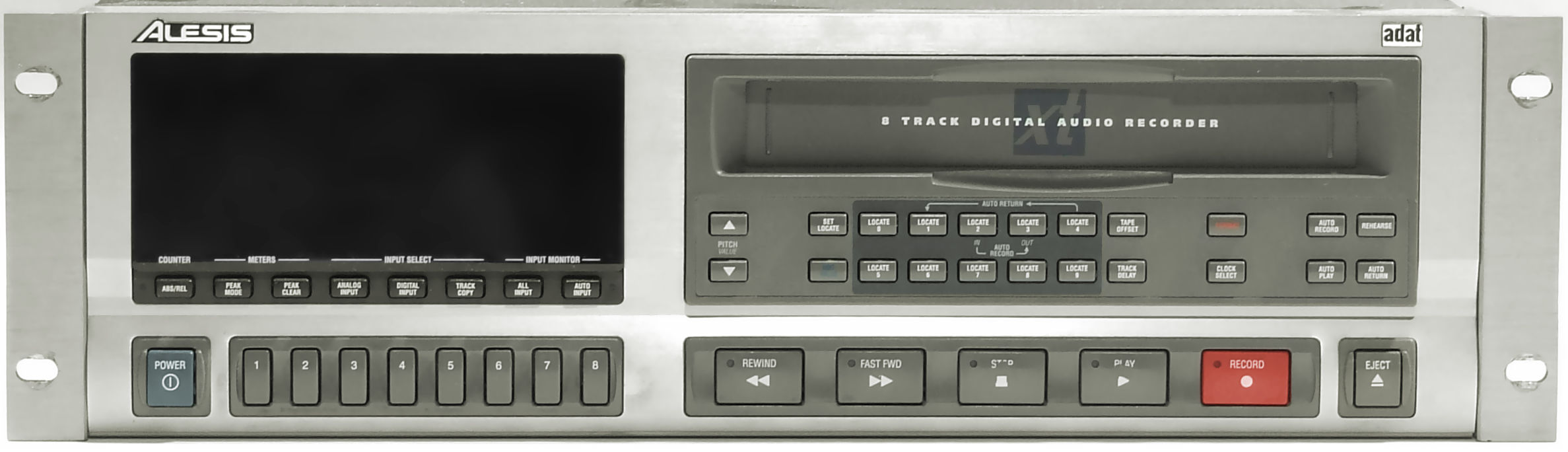
- An ADAT XT 8-channel digital audio recorder
- Media type: Magnetic cassette tape
- Encoding: Lossless real-time
- Read mechanism: Rotating head
- Write mechanism: Rotating head, helical scan
- Developed by: Alesis
- Usage: Professional digital audio
- Extended from: S-VHS
- Released: 1991; 35 years ago

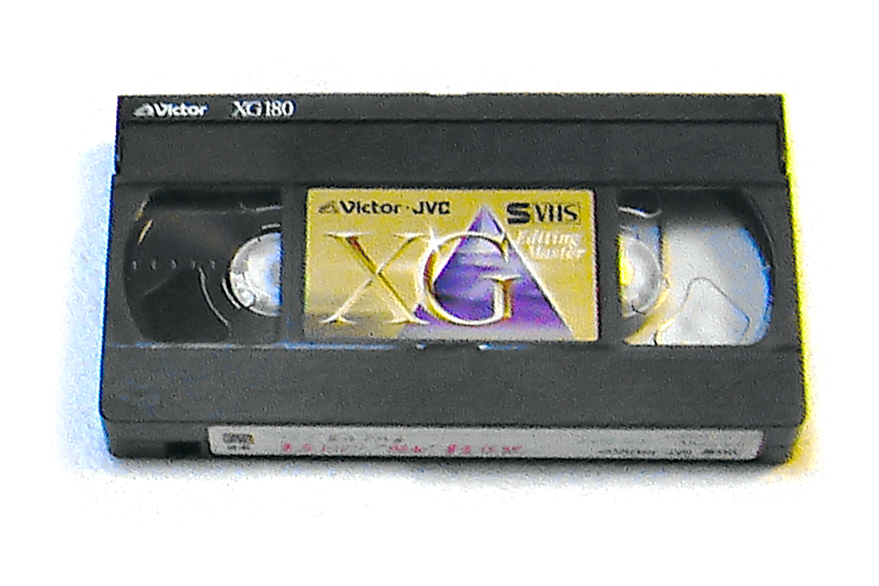
An S-VHS tape, which is also used for ADAT

Alesis Digital Audio Tape, commonly referred to as ADAT, is a magnetic tape format used for the recording of eight digital audio tracks onto the same S-VHS tape used by consumer VCRs, and the basis of a series of multitrack recorders by Alesis. Although originally a tape-based format, the term ADAT later also referred to hard disk recorders like the Alesis ADAT HD24. In 2004, recognizing the ADAT for "beginning a revolution of affordable recording tools," it was inducted into the first-ever TEC Awards TECnology Hall of Fame.

== History ==
Alesis announced the first ADAT model at the NAMM Show in Anaheim, California in January 1991, with the first ADAT recorders shipping over a year later in February or March 1992. This original ADAT model recorded up to 8 tracks of 16-bit digital audio on a standard S-VHS tape cartridge. Additionally, up to 16 ADATs could be connected to each other to record up to 128 tracks simultaneously with sample-accurate timing. This capability and the ADAT's low cost (it was originally introduced at US$3,995) were largely responsible for the rise of project studios in the 1990s.

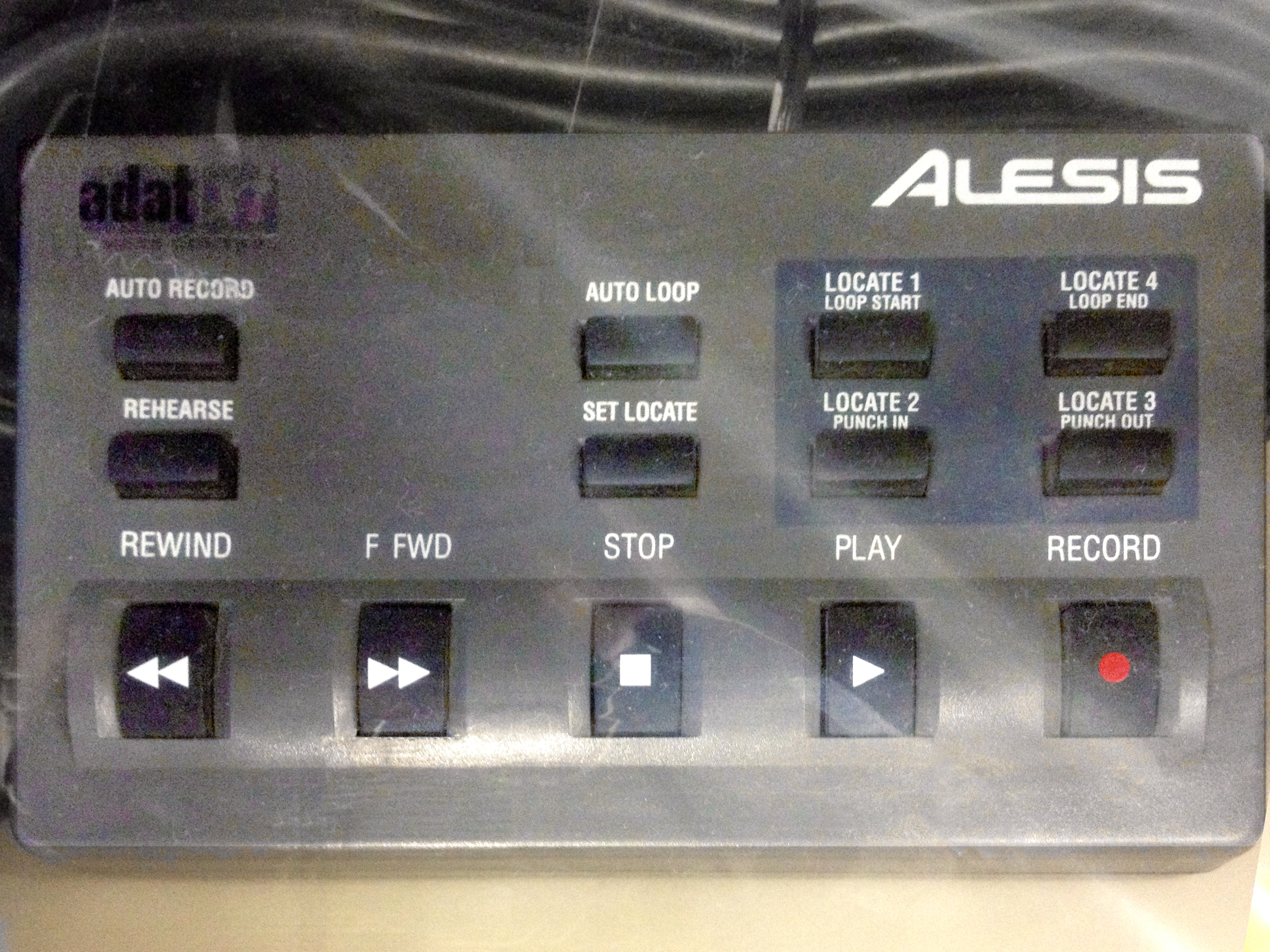
LRC (Little Remote Control)

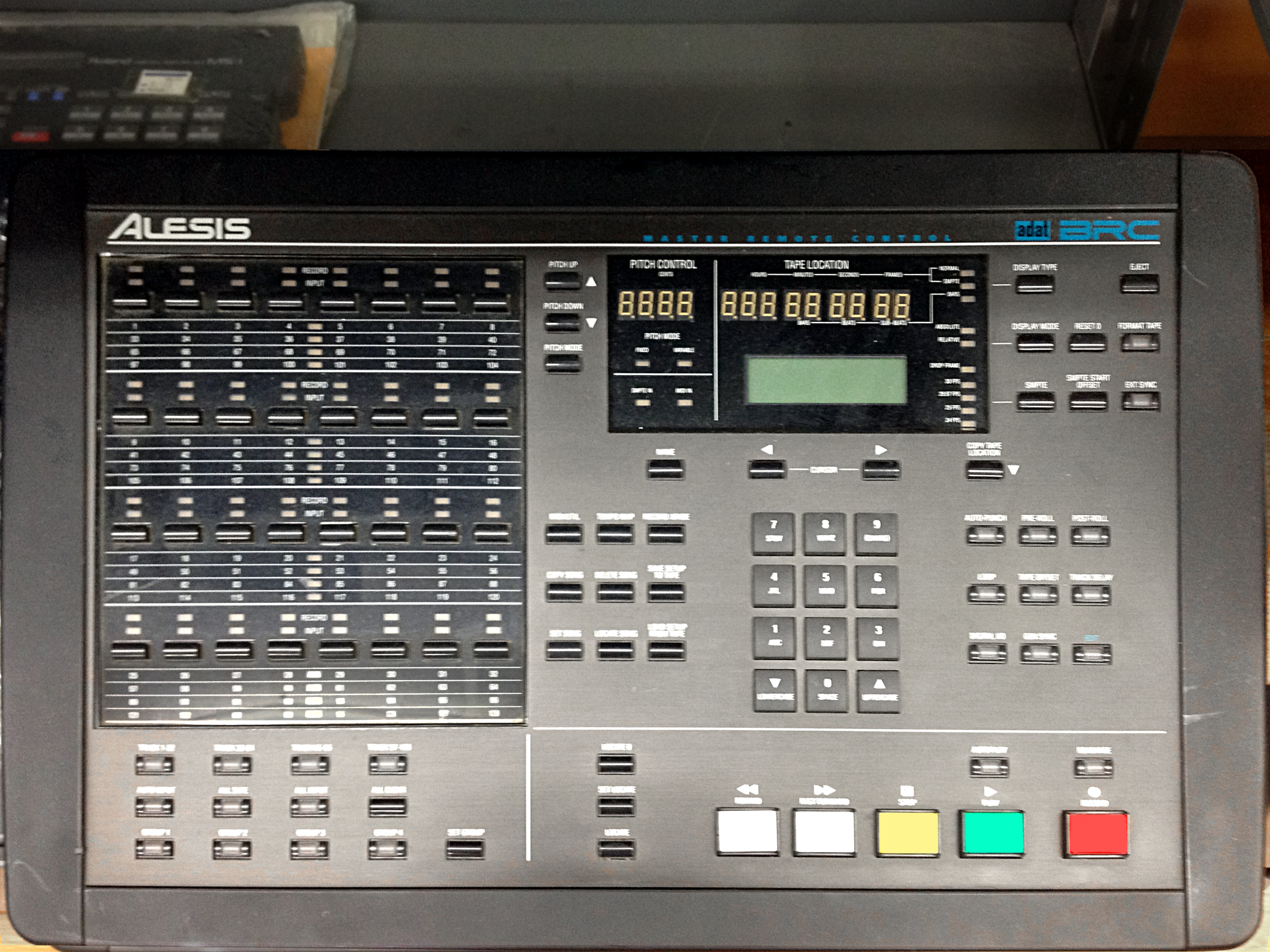
BRC (Big Remote Control) Master ADAT Controller

Alesis produced several models of ADAT recorders. The original ADAT (later referred to as Blackface) and the ADAT XT record 16 bits per sample (ADAT Type I). A later generation of machines—the XT-20, LX-20 and M-20—support 20 bits per sample (ADAT Type II). All ADAT machines use the same high-quality S-VHS tape media. Tapes recorded in the older Type I format can be read and written in the more modern machines, but not the other way around. Later generations are capable of recording at a sample rate of either 44.1 or 48 kHz, common in the audio industry. Pitch control is available by varying the sample rate and thus tape speed accordingly.

With locate points, it was possible to store sample-exact positions on tape, making it easy to find specific parts of digital recordings. Using auto play and auto record functions made it possible to punch in/out at predetermined points, rather than relying on human timing ability to start and stop recording at precisely the right instant.

ADAT machines could be controlled externally with the Alesis LRC (Little Remote Control), which could be attached to the ADAT with a 1/4" tip/sleeve plug, and featured the transport controls and most commonly used functions. Alternatively, the BRC (Big Remote Control) could be used, which included many more features that the stand-alone ADAT did not have.

== See also ==
- Digital Audio Tape
- Digital Audio Stationary Head
- Digital Tape Recording System
- Multitrack recording
