= Digital Audio Stationary Head =

Digital audio tape format

- Media type: Magnetic tape
- Encoding: Lossless real-time
- Read mechanism: Stationary head
- Write mechanism: Stationary head
- Developed by: Sony
- Usage: Audio storage
- Extended from: Reel-to-reel
- Released: 1982; 44 years ago

The Digital Audio Stationary Head or DASH standard is a reel-to-reel, digital audio tape format introduced by Sony in early 1982 for high-quality multitrack studio recording and mastering, as an alternative to analog recording methods. DASH is capable of recording two channels of audio on a quarter-inch tape, and 24 or 48 tracks on 1/2-inch-wide (13 mm) tape on open reels of up to 14 inches. The data is recorded on the tape linearly, with a stationary recording head, as opposed to the DAT format, where data is recorded helically with a rotating head, in the same manner as a VCR. The audio data is encoded as linear PCM and boasts strong cyclic redundancy check (CRC) error correction, allowing the tape to be physically edited with a razor blade as analog tape would, e.g. by cutting and splicing, and played back with no loss of signal. In a two-track DASH recorder, the digital data is recorded onto the tape across nine data tracks: eight for the digital audio data and one for the CRC data; there is also provision for two linear analog cue tracks and one additional linear analog track dedicated to recording time code.

Digital audio recorders are fundamentally high bit-rate data recorders storing PCM encoded audio data. The main advantage of any digital recording medium is that of consistent, flat frequency response, high dynamic range audio reproduction compared to analog tape recorders, which is why some of the first uses of digital audio recording were for classical music. To further increase usable dynamic range, early DASH recorders included a specialized circuit called "Emphasis" which was intended to help overcome the noise of analog to digital and digital to analog converters of the time by boosting high frequencies on the front end. This circuit required complementary de-emphasis on playback after the DAC for accurate reproduction. While emphasis was almost a necessity in earlier units, the circuit, of course, had a sound of its own and was used less and less as converter design improved.

There were three families of DASH recorders produced by Sony and Studer, with few differences among them:

- 2 track: PCM-3402, PCM-3202, Studer D820x
- 24 track: PCM-3324, PCM-3324A, PCM-3324S
- 48 track: PCM-3348, PCM-3348HR, and the Studer D820 and D827
- TASCAM also produced a 24-track DASH recorder, the DA-800/24.

With the exception of the Sony PCM-3348HR and Studer D827, all of the DASH recorders have 16-bit resolution with a 44.1 kHz or 48 kHz sampling rate, although it is possible to use an outboard analog-to-digital converter of up to 20-bit resolution. The PCM-3348HR and D827 are capable of 24-bit 48 kHz operation at 45 ips, and are the only machines that still find significant use today, often in only the highest-end studios for music and film production. All DASH recorders primarily use the SDIF-2 (Sony Digital Interface Format-2) as a digital interface, which is slightly different from the S/PDIF or AES3 that nearly all other digital audio recorders use, but is technically superior because SDIF-2's word clock is not multiplexed into the bitstream.

Because SDIF-2 is often only found on the expensive DASH recorders, it is also often only found on the highest-end mixing consoles, such as those made by Solid State Logic.

== Tape ==
One significant advantage offered by DASH recorders over the analog recorders of the day was that 'proper' tape biasing was unimportant, as there is no means for the tape to 'color' the sound of the recorded data. This was a nice advantage, and routine maintenance amounted to not much more than keeping the tape guides clean. Due to this fact, the formulation of tape does not change the sound quality, unlike analog machines which must be set for specific formulae.

The 2-track DASH machines use 1/4" wide tape, while the 24 and 48 track versions use 1/2" wide tape. One interesting thing of note is that the 24-track machines only utilize half of the tape's width, and can be played on the 48-track machines with no modifications. Similarly, the 48-track tapes can be played on a 24-track machine, but only the first 24 tracks are capable of being reproduced.

DASH recorders (as well as any other type of digital recorder using magnetic tape) require the use of metal-particle formulation magnetic tape. Some examples of metal particle tape compatible with DASH machines are 3M Scotch 275, Ampex / Quantegy 467, EMTEC 931, and Sony's own tape formulation. These tape formulations are not directly compatible with any analog open-reel tape recorder.

The DASH format is not compatible with the only other popular open reel stationary head digital recording format, Mitsubishi's ProDigi, which was available as 2-, 16-, and 32-track variations.

== See also ==
- ProDigi
- Nagra
- Studer
- Soundstream
- 3M
- Ampex
