= Crystal oscillator frequencies =

Frequencies used by electrical components

Crystal oscillators can be manufactured for oscillation over a wide range of frequencies, from a few kilohertz up to several hundred megahertz. Many applications call for a crystal oscillator frequency conveniently related to some other desired frequency, so hundreds of standard crystal frequencies are made in large quantities and stocked by electronics distributors. Using frequency dividers, frequency multipliers and phase locked loop circuits, it is practical to derive a wide range of frequencies from one reference frequency.

The UART column shows the highest common baud rate (under 1,000,000), assuming a clock pre-divider of 16 is resolved to an exact integer baud rate. Though some UART variations have fractional dividers, those concepts are ignored to simplify this table.

Frequency (MHz)	comm	UART	A/V	RTC	Notes and Primary uses
0.032000				Yes	Real-time clock, watches; allows binary division to 1 kHz signal (2^{5}×1 kHz).
0.032768				Yes	2^{15} allows binary division to 1 Hz. Real-time clock, quartz watches and clocks; common low-speed for microcontrollers. Very common. Available as TCXO.
0.038000					Used with FM stereo encoder chip BA1404 and similar.
0.065536				Yes	2^{16} allows binary division to 1 Hz and 32.768 kHz. Real-time clock.
0.077500				Yes	Real-time clock, quartz watches and clocks; also the DCF77 frequency
0.100000				Yes	10^{5} allows decade division to 1 Hz and 1 kHz. Real-time clock, quartz watches and clocks, DMM dual slope ADCs (suppresses 50 Hz noise)
0.120000				Yes	DMM dual slope ADCs (suppresses 60 Hz noise)
0.131072				Yes	2^{17} allows binary division to 1 Hz and 32.768 kHz. Found in Fluke 17/19 DMM's
0.262144				Yes	2^{18} allows binary division to 1 Hz and 32.768 kHz. Found in Bulova Precisionist high-frequency quartz watches.
0.383000					Ceramic resonator, in e.g. Polaroid Sonia Transducer for distance
0.429000			radio (filter)		Ceramic resonator used in some intermediate frequency filters. Common in oscillators of 36 kHz infrared remote controls (divided by 12)
0.455000			radio (filter)		Ceramic resonator used in FM broadcasting intermediate frequency filters. Common in oscillators of 38 kHz infrared remote controls (divided by 12), cheaper than crystal but less stable frequency
0.460800		28800	radio		Ceramic resonator used in HART. UART clock allows integer division to common baud rates up to 28,800(×16×1) or 57,600(×8×1).
0.480000			radio (filter)		Ceramic resonator used in some intermediate frequency filters and low-cost oscillators. Also used in DTMF generator oscillators.
0.500000			radio (filter)		Ceramic resonator used in some intermediate frequency filters and low-cost oscillators
0.524288				Yes	2^{19} allows binary division to 1 Hz and 32.768 kHz.
1.000					10^{6} allows decade division to 1 Hz and 1 kHz. Reference frequency. Common standard frequency. Harmonics fall on integer MHz frequencies.
1.048576				Yes	2^{20} allows binary division to 1 Hz and 32.768 kHz. Real-time clock.
1.008		1200			UART clock allows integer division to common baud rates up to 1,200(×8×105). Used in some 1200 baud modems.
1.544	DS1				Bit clock for DS1 systems (±32 ppm, ANSI T1.102).
1.8432		115200			UART clock allows integer division to common baud rates up to 115,200(×16×1) or 230,400(×8×1). Since older UARTs used this frequency to derive common baud rates up to 115,200, then multiples of this frequency are able to do the same, such as 3.6864 / 5.5296 / 7.3728 / 9.216 / 11.0592 / 12.9024 / 14.7456 / 16.5888 / 18.432 / 20.2752 / 22.1184 / 23.9616 / 25.8048 / 27.648 / 29.4912 / 31.3344 / 33.1776 / 35.0208 / 36.864 / ..., and is why these MHz frequencies are commonly used.
2.048	E1				Allows binary division to 1 kHz (2^{11}×1 kHz). Bit clock for E1 systems (±50 ppm, ITU G3703).
2.097152				Yes	2^{21} allows binary division to 1 Hz and 32.768 kHz; real-time clock; also for DDS generators with 1 Hz step
2.4576		38400			UART clock allows integer division to common baud rates up to 38,400(×16×4) or 76,800(×16×2).
2.500	Ethernet				Ethernet clock for 10 Mbit/s
2.560					Allows binary division to 10 kHz (2^{8}×10 kHz)
2.8224		2400	audio		Used in CD-DA systems and CD-ROM drives; allows binary division to 44.1 kHz (64×44.1 kHz), 22.05 kHz, and 11.025 kHz. DSD64 bitrate. Frequencies also used are 5.6448 MHz, 11.2896 MHz, 16.9344 MHz, 22.5972 MHz, 33.8688 MHz and 45.1584 MHz.
2.880		7200			UART clock allows integer division to common baud rates up to 7,200(×16×25) or 14,400(×8×25). Audio clock allows integer division for 48 / 96 / 192 ksps.
3.072		128000	audio	Yes	Allows binary division to 3 kHz (2^{10}×3 kHz); can be used to generate 60 Hz signals (51200×60 Hz). Used in audio systems, for 48 kHz (64×), 96 kHz (32×), 192 kHz (16×), 384 kHz (8×)
3.088	DS1				2×1.544, the bit clock for DS1 systems (±32 ppm, ANSI T1.102). Available as TCXO and OCXO.
3.2768				Yes	Allows binary division to 100 Hz (32,768×100 Hz, or 2^{15}×100 Hz) and to 50 Hz, used in e.g. wattmeters and DC-AC converters
3.560	Amateur Radio				A common QRP frequency (80-meter band), also called 3560 kHz. Other less common crystals for the same band are 3.535, 3.550 (SKKC), 3.579 (digital modes) MHz. See also 7.025 MHz.
3.575611			PAL		PAL M color subcarrier
3.579545			NTSC		NTSC M color subcarrier; see colorburst. More specifically, 5 * 7 * 9 / 88 = 3.5795̅4̅ MHz. Because these are very common and inexpensive they are used in many other applications, for example DTMF generators. Multiplies x3 to 10.7 MHz FM radio intermediate frequency
3.582056			PAL		PAL-N color subcarrier
3.595295			NTSC		NTSC M color subcarrier, plus horizontal scan rate (15,750). Used for a rainbow color test, produces color through the entire 360 degrees of phase shift. Unusual.
3.640			radio		8×455 kHz AM broadcast band intermediate frequency; also often used in infrared remote controls as the clock source
3.6864	W-CDMA	230400			UART clock allows integer division to common baud rates up to 230,400(×16×1) or 460,800(×8×1). Also used in W-CDMA systems.
3.93216				Yes	Allows binary division to 60 Hz (65536×60 Hz, 2^{16}×60 Hz), used e.g. in wattmeters, DC-AC converters and NTSC vertical sync generators
4.000					Common general low-power microcontroller frequency. Common as cheap ceramic resonators where frequency stability is of less concern than cost.
4.032		7200			UART clock allows integer division to common baud rates up to 7,200(×16×35) or 14,400(×8×35), used for some 1200, 2400, and 4800 baud modems.
4.096	ISDN	256000		Yes	Allows binary division to 1 kHz (2^{12}×1 kHz). Used in ISDN systems. Allows binary division to 50 Hz (2^{12}×50 Hz x10)
4.190					Ceramic resonator used in some intermediate frequency filters and low-cost oscillators, common
4.194304				Yes	2^{22} allows binary division to 1 Hz and 32.768 kHz. Real-time clock. For DDS generators with 1 Hz step. Used in the original Game Boy.
4.320		1800		Yes	Used for measuring 1pps deviations in 1/50th seconds per day (24h × 60m × 60s × 50). UART clock allows integer division to common baud rates up to 1,800(×16×150) or 7,200(×8×75). Audio clock allows integer division for 48 / 96 ksps.
4.3218			audio		Used in CD-DA systems and CD-ROM drives; allows integer division to 44.1 kHz (98×44.1 kHz), 22.05 kHz, and 11.025 kHz. Frequencies also used are 8.6436 MHz and 17.2872 MHz.
4.332	RDS				3648× the RDS signal bit rate of 1187.5 bit/s. While the frequency of 4.332 MHz is the most commonly used crystal resonator, its multiples (2×4.332 MHz = 8.664 MHz or 4×4.332 MHz = 17.328 MHz) have been used also. Multiplies x100 to 433.2 MHz ISM radio band. See also twice the frequency, 8.664 MHz. Multiplies x110 to 476.52MHz, the Channel 1 frequency for Australian UHF Citizen's Band radios
4.43361875			PAL/NTSC		PAL B/D/G/H/I and NTSC M4.43 color subcarrier. Also used in Compact Disc players and recorders where the crystal frequency is slightly pulled to 4.41 MHz and then divided by 100 to give the 44.1 kHz sampling frequency. See also twice the frequency, 8.867238 MHz.
4.608		57600	audio	Yes	UART clock allows integer division to common baud rates up to 57,600(×16×5) or 115,200(×8×5). Audio clock allows integer division for 48 / 96 / 192 / 384 ksps. Allows integer division to 1.024 MHz, 1.024 kHz, 1 kHz, 60 Hz, 50 Hz. Common microcontroller clock frequency. Frequency of the Master Timing Unit (MTU) OCXO of the Space Shuttle.
4.7547			radio (ISM)		Oscillator for 315 MHz FSK/ASK superheterodyne receivers with 10.7 MHz intermediate frequency (common Chinese ISM band use for small RF remote controls), multiplied 64× (4.7547×64+10.7=315)
4.897					Reference clock for some 315 MHz transmitters and receivers, e.g. garage door openers. (Alternative frequencies for the same chipsets: 6.0630 MHz for 390 MHz, 6.4983 MHz for 418.00 MHz, 6.7458 MHz for 433.92 MHz; swapping them can swap the band.)
4.9152	CDMA	38400			Used in CDMA systems; divided to 1.2288 MHz baseband frequency as specified by J-STD-008. UART clock allows integer division to common baud rates up to 38,400(×16×8) or 76,800(×8×4). Allows binary division to 60 Hz (2^{12}×60 Hz x10)
5.000					Common standard frequency. Commonly available as TCXO and OCXO.
5.034965			NTSC		Integer multiple of the 59.94 Hz (84000×) vertical refresh and the 15.734 kHz (320×) horizontal scan rates
5.0688		57600			UART clock allows integer division to common baud rates up to 14,400(×16×22) or 57,600(×8×11).
5.120				Yes	Allows binary division to 10 kHz (2^{9}×10 kHz)
5.185			radio		Used in radio transceivers, clock for some microcontrollers
5.5296		115200			UART clock allows integer division to common baud rates up to 115,200(×16×3) or 230,400(×8×3).
5.6448		14400	audio		Used in CD-DA systems and CD-ROM drives; allows binary division to 44.1 kHz (128×44.1 kHz), 22.05 kHz, and 11.025 kHz. DSD128 bitrate (2× 2.8224 MHz). Frequencies also used (multiplies of 5.6448) are 11.2896 MHz, 16.9344 MHz, 22.5972 MHz, 33.8688 MHz and 45.1584 MHz.
6.000	USB				Common in low-speed (1.5 Mbit/s) USB devices such as computer keyboards.
6.063					Reference clock for some 390 MHz transmitters and receivers, e.g. garage door openers. (Alternative frequencies for the same chipsets: 4.8970 MHz for 315.00 MHz, 6.4983 MHz for 418.00 MHz, 6.7458 MHz for 433.92 MHz; swapping them can swap the band.)
6.144		38400	audio	Yes	Digital audio systems - DAT, MiniDisc, sound cards; 128×48 kHz (2^{7}×48 kHz). UART clock allows integer division to common baud rates up to 38,400(×16×10) or 256,000(×8×3).
6.176	DS1				4×1.544, the bit clock for DS1 systems (±32 ppm, ANSI T1.102). Available as TCXO and OCXO.
6.400					Binary multiple of 100 kHz (64×100 kHz), 50 kHz, 25 kHz, 12.5 kHz. Half of the common standard 12.8 MHz.
6.4512		115200			21×307.2 kHz; UART clock allows integer division to common baud rates up to 57,600(×16×7) or 115,200(×8×7). See also 3×, 19.3536 MHz.
6.480	SONET	28800			Used to generate (×8) 51.84 MHz, the SONET STS-1 frequency (with accuracy of 20 =ppm).
6.4983					Reference clock for some 418 MHz transmitters and receivers, e.g. TV remote extenders or wireless sensors. (Alternative frequencies for the same chipsets: 4.8970 MHz for 315.00 MHz, 6.0630 MHz for 390 MHz, 6.7458 MHz for 433.92 MHz; swapping them can swap the band.)
6.5536					Allows binary division to 100 Hz (65,536×100 Hz, or 2^{16}×100 Hz); used also in red boxes
6.6128			radio (ISM)		Oscillator for 433.92 MHz FSK/ASK superheterodyne receivers with 10.7 MHz intermediate frequency (common ISM band use for small RF remote controls), multiplied 64× (6.6128×64+10.7=433.92)
6.7458					Reference clock for some 433.92 MHz ISM band transmitters and receivers, e.g. wireless sensors. (Alternative frequencies for the same chipsets: 4.8970 MHz for 315.00 MHz, 6.0630 MHz for 390 MHz, 6.4983 MHz for 418.00 MHz; swapping them can swap the band.) Available as TCXO.
6.750			SDTV		SDTV NTSC 4:3 pixel clock (picture = 352×480i @ 29.9̅7̅0̅0̅2̅9̅ Hz; frame = 429×525 @ 30×1000/1001 Hz)
7.023	Amateur Radio				CW Paradise in China. A common QRP frequency (40-meter band). Used with Pixie QRPP transceiver. Other less common frequencies are 7.030 (QRP, digital), 7.035, 7.040, 7.045, 7.048, 7.050, 7.055 (SKKC), 7.060, 7.070 (digital), 7.110 (QRP), 7.114, 7.122 MHz.
7.15909			NTSC		NTSC M color subcarrier (2×3.579545 MHz)
7.200	DARC	1800			UART clock allows integer division to common baud rates up to 1,800(×16×250) or 7,200(×8×125). Audio clock allows integer division for 48 / 96 ksps. Half of the more common 14.4 MHz. Reference clock for DARC.
7.3728		460800			UART clock allows integer division to common baud rates up to 460,800(×16×1) or 921,600(×8×1).
7.600			Radio		PLL clock for pilot tone (400×19 kHz) in FM stereo.
8.000	CAN				Used in CAN bus systems and with many small microcontroller systems. Common general microcontroller frequency (i.e. STM32 Nucleo boards, 3.3V AVR-based Arduino boards). Common as cheap ceramic resonators where frequency stability is less concern than cost.
8.184	GPS				Half the 16.368 MHz frequency; same use in different chipsets. 8 times the 1.023 MHz C/A GPS signal chipping rate. Multiplied by 192.5 to get the 1575.42 MHz L1 frequency and multiplied by 150 to get the 1227.60 MHz L2 frequency.
8.192	ISDN	256000	audio	Yes	Allows binary division to 1 kHz (2^{13}×1 kHz). Used in ISDN systems. Used in OKI Speech Processor. Common audio clock, 256×32 kHz (see also 11.2896, 12.288, 16.384, 18.4323, 22.5792, 24.576 MHz). Typical TDM/PCM audio interface clock, 1/6 of 49.152 MHz.
8.388608				Yes	2^{23} allows binary division to 1 Hz and 32.768 kHz. Real-time clock; also for DDS generators with 1 Hz step. Used in the Game Boy Color.
8.4672		1800	audio		Used in CD-DA systems and CD-ROM drives; allows integer division to 44.1 kHz (192×44.1 kHz), 22.05 kHz, and 11.025 kHz. UART clock allows integer division to common baud rates up to 1,800(×16×294) or 7,200(×8×147). Frequencies also used are 11.2896 MHz, 16.9344 MHz, 22.5972 MHz, 33.8688 MHz and 45.1584 MHz.
8.6436			audio		Used in CD-DA systems and CD-ROM drives; allows integer division to 44.1 kHz (196×44.1 kHz), 22.05 kHz, and 11.025 kHz. Frequencies also used are 4.3218 MHz and 17.2872 MHz.
8.664	RDS				The RDS signal bit rate is at 1.1875 kbit/s. While the frequency of 4.332 MHz is the most commonly used crystal resonator, its multiples (2×4.332 MHz = 8.664 MHz or 4×4.332 MHz = 17.328 MHz) have been used also.
8.86724; 8.867238			PAL		PAL B/G/H color subcarrier (2×4.433618 MHz)
9.000			SDTV		SDTV PAL/NTSC 16:9 pixel clock (480×480i@29.97, 480×576i@25)
9.216		576000	audio	Yes	UART clock allows integer division to common baud rates up to 115,200(×16×5), 576,000(×16×1). Audio clock allows integer division for 48 / 96 / 192 / 384 ksps. Allows integer division to 1.024 MHz, 1.024 kHz, 1 kHz, 60 Hz, 50 Hz. Master clock for some Japanese variants of DOCSIS.
9.29063			radio (ISM)		Oscillator for 308 MHz FSK/ASK superheterodyne receivers with 10.7 MHz intermediate frequency (less common band used for small RF remote controls), multiplied 32× (9.29063*32+10.7=308)
9.50939			radio (ISM)		Oscillator for 315 MHz FSK/ASK superheterodyne receivers with 10.7 MHz intermediate frequency (common Chinese ISM band used for small RF remote controls), multiplied 32× (9.50939*32+10.7=315)
9.54545			NTSC		2/3 of the 14.31818 MHz NTSC clock, 1/3 of the 28.636 MHz clock; common clock for microcontrollers and older processors. Exactly 210/22 MHz.
9.600		4800			UART clock allows integer division to common baud rates up to 4,800(×16×125) or 9,600(×8×125). Available as TCXO and OCXO. Used in 19.2 and 48 MHz PLL generators. Can be used as seed clock for 48 and 60 GHz PLL oscillators and in frequency synthesizers for mobile radio as the common channel spacings can be easily derived.
9.8304	CDMA	38400			Used in CDMA systems (2×4.9152 MHz); divided to 1.2288 MHz baseband frequency. UART clock allows integer division to common baud rates up to 38,400(×16×16) or 76,800(×8×16).
9.84375			radio (ISM)		Used as clock in some 315 MHz remote fob and IoT transmitters (multiplied by 32); 13.560 MHz used for 433.92 MHz
9.900			SDTV		SDTV NTSC pixel clock (528×480i@29.97)
10.000					10^{7} allows decade division to 1 Hz and 1 kHz. Common standard frequency. Commonly available as TCXO, the most common OCXO and GPS-disciplined oscillator available. Common stratum 3 Network Time Protocol frequency. Common general microcontroller frequency. Common as cheap ceramic resonators where frequency stability is less concern than cost.
10.106	Amateur Radio				A common QRP frequency (30-meter band). Other crystals are 10.116 (QRP), 10.118, 10.120 (SKKC), 10.140 (digital) MHz. See also 7.025 MHz.
10.125			SDTV		SDTV PAL/NTSC pixel clock (544×480i@29.97, 544×576i@25)
10.230	GPS				Found in some GPS receivers. Equals the P(Y) GPS signal chipping rate. 10 times the 1.023 MHz C/A GPS signal chipping rate. Multiplied by 154 to get the 1575.42 MHz L1 frequency and multiplied by 120 to get the 1227.60 MHz L2 frequency. Available as OCXO and TCXO.
10.240	DOCSIS/TD-SCDMA			Yes	Allows binary division to 10 kHz (2^{10}×10 kHz). Common as a clock in CB radio PLL frequency synthesizers to generate the 5 kHz or 10 kHz reference signal. Used in frequency synthesizers in some cordless phones and in many radio frequency transceivers. Master clock for DOCSIS/EuroDOCSIS. Used in cable modem termination systems. Used to derive symbol and chip rate in conventional TD-SCDMA systems. Available as OCXO and TCXO.
10.245	FM radio				Used in radio receivers; mixes with 10.7 MHz intermediate frequency (IF) yielding 455 kHz signal, a common second IF for FM radio
10.368	DECT	14400			Reference clock for DECT phones. Available as TCXO. Other frequencies are 13.824 and 20.736 MHz. UART clock allows integer division to common baud rates up to 14,400(×16×45) or 28,800(×8×45). Can be divided by 64 to generate 162 kHz for ALS162 decoding.
10.416667	Ethernet				Multiplied by 12 to 125 MHz Gigabit Ethernet GMII GTXCLK clock, FDDI clock
10.70	FM radio		radio (filter)		Most common crystal or ceramic resonator for first intermediate frequency filter in FM radio; common in other applications due to ubiquity and low cost, filter bandwidth varies (e.g. ±250/230/180/150/110 kHz to both sides from the 10.7 MHz frequency)
11.0592		230400			UART clock allows integer division to common baud rates up to 230,400(×16×3) or 460,800(×8×3); common clock for Intel 8051 microprocessors
11.2896		14400	audio		Used in CD-DA systems and CD-ROM drives; allows binary division to 44.1 kHz (256×44.1 kHz), 22.05 kHz, and 11.025 kHz. DSD256 bitrate (4x2.8224 MHz). Frequencies also used are 16.9344 MHz, 22.5972 MHz, 33.8688 MHz and 45.1584 MHz. UART clock allows integer division to common baud rates up to 14,400(×16×49) and 28,800(×8×49).
11.454544	teletext				Used in some teletext circuits; 2×5.727272 MHz (clock frequency of NTSC M teletext; PAL B uses 6.9375 MHz, SECAM uses 6.203125 MHz, PAL G uses 6.2031 MHz, and PAL I uses 4.4375 MHz clock)
11.520		28800			UART clock allows integer division to common baud rates up to 28,800(×16×25) or 57,600(×8×25).
12.000	USB/CAN				Used in USB 1.0 and 2.0 systems (with accuracy of 500 ppm) as the reference clock for the full-speed PHY rate of 12 Mbit/s, or multiplied up using a PLL to clock high speed PHYs at 480 Mbit/s; common clock for Intel 8051 microprocessors; also used in CAN bus systems. Common general microcontroller frequency. Common as cheap ceramic resonators where frequency stability is less concern than cost.
12.272727			SDTV		Clock rate for exactly square pixels in interleaved 4:3 640×480i@29.97 NTSC video ($\tfrac{135}{11}$ MHz). In practice the more commonly available 12.288 MHz frequency is close enough for most applications.
12.288		76800	audio	Yes	Digital audio systems - DAT, MiniDisc, sound cards; 256×48 kHz (2^{8}×48 kHz). UART clock allows integer division to common baud rates up to 76,800(×16×20) or 256,000(×16×3)
12.352	DS1				8x1.544, the bit clock for DS1 systems (±32 ppm, ANSI T1.102). Available as TCXO and OCXO.
12.40625	teletext				Used in some teletext circuits; 2×6.203125 MHz (clock frequency of SECAM teletext; PAL B uses 6.9375 MHz, NTSC M uses 5.727272 MHz, PAL G uses 6.2031 MHz, and PAL I uses 4.4375 MHz clock)
12.72813			radio (ISM)		Oscillator for 418 MHz FSK/ASK superheterodyne receivers with 10.7 MHz intermediate frequency (less common band used for small RF remote controls), multiplied 32x (12.72813x32+10.7=418)
12.800					Common standard frequency, common reference clock; binary multiple of 100 kHz (128×100 kHz), 50 kHz, 25 kHz, 12.5 kHz. Commonly available as TCXO and OCXO. Common stratum 3 frequency. Divides by 2^{10} to 12.5kHz, the channel spacing for Australian UHF Citizen's Band radios
12.9024		115200			UART clock allows integer division to common baud rates up to 115,200(×16×7) or 230,400(×8×7)
12.960		1800			UART clock allows integer division to common baud rates up to 1,800(×16×450) or 7,200(×8×225)
13.000	GSM/UMTS				Commonly used as a reference clock for GSM and UMTS handsets. (13 MHz is exactly 48 times the GSM bit rate). Commonly available as TCXO and OCXO.
13.22563			radio (ISM)		Oscillator for 433.92 MHz FSK/ASK superheterodyne receivers with 10.7 MHz intermediate frequency (less common band used for small RF remote controls), multiplied 32x (13.22563*32+10.7=433.12)
13.500			SDTV		Master clock for PAL/NTSC DVD players, Digital TV receivers, etc. (13.5 MHz is an exact multiple of the PAL and NTSC line frequencies); pixel clock for 4:3 SDTV PAL/NTSC (720×480i@29.97, 720×576i@25, 352×480p@59.94). CCIR-601 PAL samplerate (864×625 resolution incl. blanking, or 720×576 visible), CCIR-601 NTSC samplerate (858×525 incl. blanking, 720×480 visible)
13.5168		76800			UART clock allows integer division to common baud rates up to 76,800(×16×11)
13.560	RFID				Common contactless smartcard frequency (ISO/IEC 14443). Also used as clock in some 433.92 MHz remote fob transmitters (multiplied by 32); 9.84375 MHz used for 315 MHz
13.824	DECT	57600			Reference clock for DECT phones. Available as TCXO. UART clock allows integer division to common baud rates up to 57,600(×16×15) or 576,000(×8×3). Other frequencies are 10.368 and 20.736 MHz.
13.875	teletext				Used in some teletext circuits; 2×6.9375 MHz (clock frequency of PAL B teletext; SECAM uses 6.203125 MHz, NTSC M uses 5.727272 MHz, PAL G uses 6.2031 MHz, and PAL I uses 4.4375 MHz clock)
14.048	Amateur Radio				A common amateur radio frequency (20-meter band). Other crystals are 14.050 (SKCC), 14.060 (QRP), 14.070 (digital) MHz. See also 7.025 MHz.
14.112		1800	audio		Digital audio systems - 294×48 kHz, 320×44.1 kHz. UART clock allows integer division to common baud rates up to 1,800(×16×490) or 7,2000(×8×245). Available as TCXO.
14.250	FM radio		PAL		used as sampling frequency for ADCs for digitizing the 10.7 MHz intermediate frequency in software-defined radio implementations of AM/FM radio receivers. Pixel clock of some PAL CCD cameras (raw image resolution of 912×625). Used in PAL version in some early Apple computers, e.g. Apple II Europlus.
14.318182			NTSC		NTSC M color subcarrier (4×3.579545 MHz). Common seed clock for modern PC motherboard clock generator chips, clock for ISA bus, also common on CGA and VGA cards and in some 8-bit computers. Exactly 315/22 MHz. 4f(sc) sampling for NTSC or 525/60 (raw image size 910×525, visible 768×475), SMPTE 244M standard.
14.350			NTSC		Pixel clock of some NTSC CCD cameras.
14.400	PDC	7200			UART clock allows integer division to common baud rates up to 7,200(×16×125) or 14,400(×8×125). Also a reference clock for PDC clock. Reference clock of some consumer GPS receivers.
14.7456		921600			UART clock allows integer division to common baud rates up to 921,600(×16×1); common clock for small microcontrollers
14.750			SDTV		Clock rate for exactly square pixels in SDTV PAL 4:3 interleaved 768×576i@25 video ($\tfrac{59}{4}$ MHz). In practice the more commonly available 14.7456 MHz frequency is close enough for most applications.
14.850					Used in some transceivers and cellular radios as a reference clock for frequency synthesis. Available as TCXO.
15.000					Used as clock in ZX8301 computer (divided to 7.5 MHz). Frequency used in photoacoustic imaging. Sometimes available as OCXO. Used in dual-frequency 315/390 MHz RF key fobs (multiplied by 21 or 26).
15.360	3G	38400		Yes	UART clock allows integer division to common baud rates up to 38,400(×16×25) or 128,000(×8×15). Also used as a 3G reference clock. Used as reference clock in some Bluetooth systems.
15.600					Used in Kenwood TS-590 transceivers. Audio clock allows integer division for 48 ksps. Available as TCXO.
16.000	CAN		HGC		Used in CAN bus systems, some USB devices. 2.4 GHz ISM transceivers. Common general microcontroller frequency (i.e. Arduino Uno and Nano boards). Common as cheap ceramic resonators where frequency stability is less concern than cost. Pixel clock for Hercules Graphics Card. Also used for ZigBee, Bluetooth and BLE, WiFi.
16.200			HDTV		Sampling clock for MUSE HDTV systems (). Rarely used as reference clock in some Bluetooth systems.
16.257			EGA		Pixel clock generator in MGA and EGA video cards (640×350@60 Hz)
16.367600; 16.367667; 16.368000	GPS				Commonly used for down-conversion and sampling in GPS-receivers. Generates intermediate frequency signal at 4.092 MHz. 16.3676 or 16.367667 MHz are sometimes used instead of 16.368 MHz to avoid perfect lineup between sampling frequency and GPS spreading code. 16.368 MHz is a reference clock of some consumer GPS receivers. 16.368 MHz is 16 times the 1.023 MHz C/A GPS signal chipping rate; multiplied by 96.25 to get the 1575.42 MHz L1 frequency and multiplied by 75 to get the 1227.60 MHz L2 frequency.
16.369	GPS				Reference clock for some GPS systems. Available as TCXO.
16.375			SDTV		SDTV NTSC 16:9 pixel clock (864×480i@29.97), square pixels (854×480 would be ideal, 864×480 is close enough and a multiple of 16 and 32 for MPEG compression blocks)
16.384		256000		Yes	Allows binary division to 1 kHz (2^{14}×1 kHz). Reference clock of some consumer GPS receivers. Common audio clock, 256×64 kHz, 512×32 kHz (see also 8.192, 11.2896, 12.288, 18.432, 22.5792, 24.576 MHz). Commonly available as TCXO and OCXO.
16.5888		115200			UART clock allows integer division to common baud rates up to 115,200(×16×9) or 230,400(×8×9).
16.67					Core speed of some microcomputers (relatively common in Motorola 68000 family); bus clock; double to 33.33 MHz, quadruple to 66.67 MHz, multiply by 6 to 100 MHz; IOAPIC clock speed, half the PCI bus frequency
16.777216				Yes	2^{24} allows binary division to 1 Hz and 32.768 kHz. Real-time clock; also for DDS generators with 1 Hz step
16.800		1200			Common standard reference frequency for PLL circuits in radio transmitters and receivers, commonly used for frequency synthesis with adjustment in 2.5, 5 or 6.25 kHz steps (6720×5 kHz, 3360×5 kHz or 2688×5.25 kHz). UART clock allows integer division to common baud rates up to 1,200(×16×875) or 2,400(×8×875). Commonly available as TCXO, VCXO and VCTCXO. Used as reference clock in some Bluetooth systems. Reference clock for some GPS systems.
16.9344		7200	audio		Used in CD-DA systems and CD-ROM drives; allows integer division to 44.1 kHz (384×44.1 kHz), 22.05 kHz, and 11.025 kHz. UART clock allows integer division to common baud rates up to 7,200(×16×147) or 14,400(×8×147). 6x2.8224 MHz (DSD64 bitrate). Frequencies also used are 11.2896 MHz, 22.5972 MHz, 33.8688 MHz and 45.1584 MHz.
17.2032	USB	76800	audio		PLL conversion by 10/7 to 24.576 MHz and by 21/16 = 22.5792 MHz, which are 256× audio sampling frequencies 48 kHz and 44.1 kHz, respectively. UART clock allows integer division to common baud rates up to 76,800(×16×14).
17.2872			audio		Used in CD-DA systems and CD-ROM drives; allows integer division to 44.1 kHz (392×44.1 kHz), 22.05 kHz, and 11.025 kHz. Frequencies also used are 4.3218 MHz and 8.6436 MHz.
17.328	RDS				The RDS signal bit rate is at 1.1875 kbit/s. While the frequency of 4.332 MHz is the most commonly used crystal resonator, its multiples (2×4.332 MHz = 8.664 MHz or 4×4.332 MHz = 17.328 MHz) have been used also.
17.664	DSL	9600			UART clock allows integer division to common baud rates up to 9,600(×16×115) or 19,200(×8×115); DSL clock: 17.664 MHz (VDSL) ... 8×2.208 MHz (ADSL ADC sampling rate)
17.734475			PAL		PAL B/G/H color subcarrier (4×4.433618 MHz); 4f(sc) sampling for PAL or 625/50, gives 1135×625 pixels incl. blankings, or 948×575 visible
18.000			SDTV/HDTV		SDTV PAL/NTSC pixel clock for 16:9 (960×480i@29.97, 480×480p@59.94, 960×576i@25, 480×576p@50)
18.096	Amateur Radio				A WARC band (17-meter), QRP. Another crystal is 18.086 MHz. See also 7.025 MHz, 10.106 MHz.
18.432		576000	audio	Yes	UART clock allows integer division to common baud rates up to 115,200 (x16x10), 230,400 (x16x5), 576,000 (x16x2). Audio clock allows integer division for 48 / 96 / 192 / 384 ksps. Allows integer division to 1.024 MHz, 1.024 kHz, 1 kHz, 60 Hz, 50 Hz.
18.75	Ethernet				Used to generate 75 MHz (×4) and 150 MHz (×8) clocks.
18.816		4800	audio/DAT		Double the master channel bitrate clock. 9.408 MHz, of Digital Audio Tape systems; 392×48 kHz. The 9.408 MHz clock is divided by 72, 18, 12, and 6 to obtain the pilot, first sync frequency, second sync frequency, and erase frequency. Available as TCXO.
18.9375			PAL		Common CCIR/PAL CCTV camera clock frequency (total frame size 1212×625, incl. blankings, @ 25 Hz)
19.069929; 19.069930; 19.069920; 19.069900			NTSC		Common EIA/NTSC CCTV camera clock frequency (total frame size 1212×525, incl. blankings, @29.97 Hz)
19.200	3G	9600	DVB		UART clock allows integer division to common baud rates up to 9,600(×16×125) or 19,200(×8×125). Also used as a 3G reference clock, due to being a least common multiple of W-CDMA chip rate 3.84 MHz (5x) and 200 kHz channel raster (96x). Commonly available as TCXO and OCXO. Also used in some DVB receiver chipsets. Reference clock of some consumer GPS receivers. Used as reference clock in some Bluetooth systems. Common stratum 3 frequency. Raspberry Pi 3 (and earlier) main clock crystal (54 MHz for Raspberry Pi 4), can be replaced with more accurate source (TCXO, OCXO, GPS-disciplined) if needed. Used in some DECT, GPS, BLE systems.
19.3536; 19.354		115200			3×6.4512 MHz; 63×307.2 kHz; UART clock allows integer division to common baud rates up to 57,600(×16×7×3) or 115,200(×8×7×3).
19.440	SONET/SDH DS1/T1/E1	1800			Used in SONET/SDH systems as a base reference clock that is multiplied to generate 77.76 MHz (×4), 155.52 MHz (×8) for OC-3, 311.04 MHz (×16), and 622.08 MHz (×32) for OC-12. Commonly available as TCXO and OCXO to meet stringent SONET/SDH accuracy requirements. Used in DS1/T1/E1 systems as a packet clock. Used as reference clock in some Bluetooth systems.
19.53125	Ethernet				Gigabit Ethernet, used to generate 78.125 MHz (×4), 156.25 MHz (×8), 312.5 MHz (×16), 625 MHz (×32); multiplies to 10 GHz MAC-side bitrate, post-serdes; 156.25 MHz = 1/66 of 10.3125 GHz, 1/64 of 10.0 GHz
19.6608	CDMA	76800			Used in CDMA systems (4×4.9152); divided to 1.2288 MHz baseband frequency; UART clock allows integer division to common baud rates up to 38,400(×16×32) or 76,800(×16×16).
19.67			SDTV		SDTV PAL 16:9 pixel clock (WSVGA 1024×576i@25), square pixels
19.680	CDMA	1200			Used in CDMA(IS-95)/CDMA2000 systems; divided to 1.2288 MHz baseband frequency; Used as reference clock in some Bluetooth systems. Commonly available as TCXO.
19.800	CDMA		SDTV		Used in some CDMA systems. Used as reference clock in some Bluetooth systems. SDTV NTSC pixel clock (528×480p@59.94)
20.000	Ethernet	500000			10 Mbit/s Ethernet. Commonly available as TCXO and OCXO. Common stratum 3 Network Time Protocol frequency. Common general microcontroller frequency. Common as cheap ceramic resonators where frequency stability is less concern than cost. Allows binary division to 10 MHz. Used in some WiFi and Bluetooth systems.
20.141601	Ethernet				Gigabit Ethernet. Used to generate 80.566406 MHz (×4) or 161.132812 MHz (×8), 1/128 and 1/64 of 10.3125 GHz of copper Gigabit Ethernet wire bit rate
20.25	TV/MAC		PAL/NTSC/SDTV		Common sampling rate of luma+chroma video components in the Multiplexed Analogue Components standard. Pixel clock for SDTV PAL/NTSC (544×480p@59.94, 544×576p@50).
20.2752		115200			UART clock allows integer division to common baud rates up to 115,200(×16×11) or 230,400(×8×11).
20.480		256000		Yes	Allows binary division to 10 kHz (2^{11}×10 kHz). Commonly available as TCXO and OCXO.
20.736	DECT	28800			Reference clock for DECT phones. Available as TCXO. Other frequencies are 10.368 and 13.824 MHz.
21.050	Amateur Radio				A common QRP frequency (15-meter band), SKCC. Other crystal is 21.060 MHz. See also 7.025 MHz.
21.47727			NTSC		NTSC M color subcarrier (6×3.579545 MHz). Common seed clock for many older computer systems, e.g. the NTSC-region NES, divided by 12 to CPU clock (1.789773 MHz); see 26.601712 MHz for PAL NES systems.
22.1184		460800			UART clock allows integer division to common baud rates up to 460,800(×16×3) or 921600(×8×3). Twice the 11.0592 MHz frequency.
22.5792		28800	audio		Used in CD-DA systems and CD-ROM drives; allows binary division to 44.1 kHz (512×44.1 kHz), 22.05 kHz, and 11.025 kHz. DSD512 bitrate (8x2.8224 MHz). Frequencies also used are 11.2896 MHz, 16.9344 MHz, 33.8688 MHz and 45.1584 MHz. UART clock allows integer division to common baud rates up to 28,800(×16×49) or 57,800(×8×49).
22.625					Used in Yaesu FT-817, FT-857, and FT-897 transceiver. Available as TCXO.
23.104	GPS				Reference clock for some GPS systems. Available as TCXO.
23.9616		115200			UART clock allows integer division to common baud rates up to 115,200(×16×13) or 230,400(×8×13).
24.000	USB Bluetooth headphones	500000			High-speed USB (24 MHz × 20 = 480 Mbit/s); LCD monitor some MCU also Bluetooth headphones. Used in some WiFi, Bluetooth and BLE systems.
24.54			SDTV		SDTV NTSC 4:3 pixel clock (640×480p@59.94)
24.5535	GPS				Reference clock for some GPS systems. Available as TCXO. Almost 24 times the 1.023 MHz C/A code chipping rate.
24.576	FireWire	256000	audio	Yes	Digital audio systems - DAT, MiniDisc, AC'97, sound cards; 512×48 kHz (2^{9}×48 kHz); also used as bus reference clock in FireWire systems (with accuracy of 100 ppm). 3x8.192 MHz. 49.1520 MHz (2x24.576) also used. Also a crystal for systems handling CCIR-601 SDTV video (here see also 26.8 MHz).
24.704	DS1				16x1.544, the bit clock for DS1 systems (±32 ppm, ANSI T1.102). Available as TCXO and OCXO.
24.906	Amateur Radio				A common QRP frequency (12-meter band). See also 7.025 MHz.
25.000	Ethernet				Fast Ethernet MII clock (100 Mbit/s/4-bit nibble) (with accuracy of 100 ppm); also multiplied by 5 to 125 MHz Also used on some laptop optical drives Gigabit Ethernet GMII GTXCLK clock, FDDI clock; used as input for 100 MHz PCI Express clock generators Used in some ISM radio systems.
25.175			VGA		Common Video Graphics Array pixel clock (i.e., 320/640×200/350/400@70 (320×200@70 Hz, 640×200@70, 320×350@70, 640×350@70, 640×400@70, VGA 640×480@60), all 31.46875 kHz horizontal)
25.8048		230400			UART clock allows integer division to common baud rates up to 230,400(×16×7) or 460,800(×8×7)
26.000	GSM/UMTS		DVB		Commonly used as a reference clock for GSM and UMTS/3G handsets. (26 MHz is exactly 96 times the GSM bit rate). Commonly available as TCXO and OCXO. Also used in some DVB receiver chipsets used on portable DVD players. Reference clock of some consumer GPS receivers. Used in Long-CZ J8, Motorola F3 phones and some early Bluetooth USB dongles. Common with ESP8266 and ESP32 chips (40 MHz is also supported). Used in some WiFi, WLan, Bluetooth, BLE, NFC and GSM systems.
26.2144					Popular for 102.4 kS/s, 204.8 kS/s or similar sampling systems, when a power-of-two size FFT follows the sampling. In this case the FFT frequency bins end up to be at "nice" frequencies for humans. Also allows integer division to 25 Hz and multiples of 25 Hz (50 Hz, 100 Hz, 200 Hz); 26.2144 MHz = 100×2^{18} = 25×2^{20}.
26.5625	Fibre Channel				Quadrupled to 106.250 MHz Fibre Channel clock
26.601712			PAL		6x the 4.43361875 color subcarrier frequency; clock crystal of the PAL region NES consoles, divided by 16 to CPU clock (1.662607 MHz), see 21.47727 MHz for NTSC region systems
26.800			SDTV		Common crystal in SDTV video handling systems (especially NTSC, square-pixel, or dual-mode systems; CCIR601 systems also use 24.576 MHz)
26.8436	Digital signal generator				Exact frequency is 2^28/10 Hz. Used to drive a DDS synthesizer with 28-bit accumulator; gives output from 0 to 2.68435 MHz in 0.1 Hz steps. Instek SFG-1000 series is one example.
26.975	RC				27 MHz band, band 0/1 (grey/brown), "split" frequency; radio-controlled models of cars, boats, aircraft
26.995	RC				27 MHz band, band 1 (brown); radio-controlled models of cars, boats, aircraft
27.000			SDTV		Master clock for PAL/NTSC DVD players, Digital TV receivers, some modems etc. (27 MHz is an exact multiple of the PAL and NTSC line frequencies). Master clock for MPEG-2 video systems (also uses multiples - 54 MHz, 81 MHz). Pixel clock for SDTV (720×480p@59.94, 720×576p@50), divides by 2 to 13.5 MHz clock (720×480i@59.94, 720×576i@25) and by 4 to 6.75 MHz, very common
27.025	RC				27 MHz band, band 1/2 (brown/red), "split" frequency; radio-controlled models of cars, boats, aircraft
27.045	RC				27 MHz band, band 2 (red); some radio-controlled models of cars, boats, aircraft
27.075	RC				27 MHz band, band 2/3 (red/orange), "split" frequency; radio-controlled models of cars, boats, aircraft
27.095	RC				27 MHz band, band 3 (orange); some radio-controlled models of cars, boats, aircraft
27.12	RFID				Twice 13.56 MHz, common contactless smartcard frequency (ISO/IEC 14443). Used in RFID/NFC systems.
27.125	RC				27 MHz band, band 3/4 (orange/yellow), "split" frequency; radio-controlled models of cars, boats, aircraft; common crystal in vintage walkie talkies
27.145	RC				27 MHz band, band 4 (yellow); some radio-controlled models of cars, boats, aircraft; gate and garage door remote controls; toy walkie talkies; between channels 15 and 16 of the CB radio
27.175	RC				27 MHz band, band 4/5 (yellow/green), "split" frequency; radio-controlled models of cars, boats, aircraft
27.195	RC				27 MHz band, band 5 (green); radio-controlled models of cars, boats, aircraft
27.225	RC				27 MHz band, band 5/6 (green/blue), "split" frequency; radio-controlled models of cars, boats, aircraft
27.255	RC				27 MHz band, band 6 (blue); some radio-controlled models of cars, boats, aircraft
27.456	GPS				Reference clock for some GPS systems. Available as TCXO.
27.648	DECT	115200		Yes	UART clock allows integer division to common baud rates up to 115,200(×16×15) or 576,000(×16×3). Twice the 13.824 MHz of DECT master clock.
28.060	Amateur Radio				A common QRP frequency (10-meter band). See also 7.025 MHz.
28.3046	3270				Twelve times the coax bit rate of IBM 3270 networks.
28.224	modems	7200	audio		UART clock allows integer division to common baud rates up to 7,200(×16×245) or 14,400(×8×245); used in some faxes and modems; modem and fax rates (504×56000, 580×48000, 840×33600, 980×28800, 1960×14400, 2352×12000, etc.); also divides to common audio frequencies (147×192000, 588×48000, 640×44100, 1280×22050, 2560×11025)
28.322			VGA		Common Video Graphics Array pixel clock (i.e., 720×350/400@70 Hz, 31.46889 kHz horizontal)
28.37516; 28.375			PAL		Master clock for some PAL CCD cameras; 2 periods per pixel, 1816 periods per scan line, 567500 periods per frame. With frequency of 28.37516 video clock for all PAL Amiga computers.
28.636363			NTSC		Master clock for some NTSC CCD cameras. Video clock for all NTSC Amiga computers. Twice the 14.31818 MHz frequency, shares its other uses, e.g. seed clock of PC ISA bus. Exactly 315/11 MHz. 8×3.598545 MHz of the NTSC colorburst. Used in some microcontroller based NTSC console emulators. See 35.46895 MHz for corresponding PAL systems.
28.800		14400	DVB-T		Used in some DVB-T USB dongle TV receivers, namely the RTL-SDR ones used for software-defined radio. UART clock allows integer division to common baud rates up to 14,400(×16×125) or 28,800(×8×125).
29.4912		921600			UART clock allows integer division to common baud rates up to 921,600(×16×2).
29.50			SDTV		SDTV PAL 4:3 pixel clock (768×576p@50), square pixels
30.000					Common CPU clock. Used in some ISM wireless systems.
30.240			VGA		Early Macintosh video pixel clock (VGA 640×480@66 Hz)
30.720	3G	38400		Yes	A 3G reference clock; twice the 15.36 MHz, 8x the 3.84 MHz WCDMA chip rate. Reference clock in W-CDMA systems; can be multiplied by 16 to 491.52 MHz common for driving DACs in WCDMA wireless base stations or by 32 to 983.04 MHz for UMTS base stations or by 8 to 245.76 MHz, other common DAC sampling frequency. UART clock; allows integer division to common baud rates (800×38400 baud or 800×32×1,200 baud). Available as VCXO, TCXO and OCXO.
31.3344		115200			UART clock; allows integer division to common baud rates (272×115200 baud or 272×96×1,200 baud). CPU frequency or multiple of it (as well as video and system master clocks) in older Apple Macintosh computers (Classic, LC, etc.).
31.50			VGA		VGA pixel clock (VESA modes 640×350@85, 640×400@85, VGA 640×480@72/75, all hsync 37.9 kHz)
32.000	LoRa				common crystal for LoRa RF chips by Semtech, available as TCXO; also used for Zigbee, 6LowPan, RF4CE, Bluetooth and BLE. Nordic nRF52 uses 32 MHz as its main clock.
32.75			SDTV		SDTV NTSC pixel clock (864×480p@59.94, close to FWVGA)
32.768				Yes	Allows binary division to 1 kHz (2^{15}×1 kHz). Reference clock of some consumer GPS receivers. Commonly available as TCXO and OCXO.
33.1776		115200			UART clock; allows integer division to common baud rates. (288×115200 baud or 288×96×1,200 baud)
33.33					Common CPU clock, PCI bus clock
33.554432				Yes	2^{25} allows binary division to 1 Hz and 32.768 kHz. Real-time clock; also for DDS generators with 1 Hz step
33.8688		115200	audio		Used in CD-DA systems and CD-ROM drives; allows integer division to 44.1 kHz (768×44.1 kHz), 22.05 kHz, and 11.025 kHz. 12x2.8224 MHz (DSD64 bitrate). Also allows integer division to common UART baud rates up to 115200. Available as a TCXO. Frequencies also used are 11.2896 MHz, 16.9344 MHz, 22.5972 MHz and 45.1584 MHz.
34.368	E3	38400			E3 data rate clock. UART clock; allows integer division to common baud rates. (895×38400 baud or 895×32×1200 baud)
34.950	RC				35 MHz band, channel 55; radio-controlled models of aircraft
34.960	RC				35 MHz band, channel 56; radio-controlled models of aircraft; VGA pixel clock (GTF mode PAL 768×576@60, hsync 35.82 kHz)
34.970	RC				35 MHz band, channel 57; radio-controlled models of aircraft
34.980	RC				35 MHz band, channel 58; radio-controlled models of aircraft
34.990	RC				35 MHz band, channel 59; radio-controlled models of aircraft
35.000	RC				35 MHz band, channel 60; radio-controlled models of aircraft
35.010	RC				35 MHz band, channel 61; radio-controlled models of aircraft
35.020	RC				35 MHz band, channel 62; radio-controlled models of aircraft
35.0208		115200			UART clock; allows integer division to common baud rates. (304×115200 baud or 304×96×1,200 baud)
35.030	RC				35 MHz band, channel 63; radio-controlled models of aircraft
35.040	RC				35 MHz band, channel 64; radio-controlled models of aircraft
35.050	RC				35 MHz band, channel 65; radio-controlled models of aircraft
35.060	RC				35 MHz band, channel 66; radio-controlled models of aircraft
35.070	RC				35 MHz band, channel 67; radio-controlled models of aircraft
35.080	RC				35 MHz band, channel 68; radio-controlled models of aircraft
35.090	RC				35 MHz band, channel 69; radio-controlled models of aircraft
35.100	RC				35 MHz band, channel 70; radio-controlled models of aircraft
35.110	RC				35 MHz band, channel 71; radio-controlled models of aircraft
35.120	RC				35 MHz band, channel 72; radio-controlled models of aircraft
35.130	RC				35 MHz band, channel 73; radio-controlled models of aircraft
35.140	RC				35 MHz band, channel 74; radio-controlled models of aircraft
35.150	RC				35 MHz band, channel 75; radio-controlled models of aircraft
35.160	RC				35 MHz band, channel 76; radio-controlled models of aircraft
35.170	RC				35 MHz band, channel 77; radio-controlled models of aircraft
35.180	RC				35 MHz band, channel 78; radio-controlled models of aircraft
35.190	RC				35 MHz band, channel 79; radio-controlled models of aircraft
35.200	RC				35 MHz band, channel 80; radio-controlled models of aircraft
35.210	RC				35 MHz band, channel 81; radio-controlled models of aircraft
35.220	RC				35 MHz band, channel 82; radio-controlled models of aircraft
35.230	RC				35 MHz band, channel 83; radio-controlled models of aircraft
35.240	RC				35 MHz band, channel 84; radio-controlled models of aircraft
35.250	RC				35 MHz band, channel 85; radio-controlled models of aircraft
35.2512		115200			UART clock; allows integer division to common baud rates. (306×115200 baud or 306×96×1,200 baud)
35.260	RC				35 MHz band, channel 86; radio-controlled models of aircraft
35.270	RC				35 MHz band, channel 87; radio-controlled models of aircraft
35.280	RC				35 MHz band, channel 88; radio-controlled models of aircraft
35.290	RC				35 MHz band, channel 89; radio-controlled models of aircraft
35.300	RC				35 MHz band, channel 90; radio-controlled models of aircraft
35.328	DSL	19200			UART clock; allows integer division to common baud rates up to 19200 (x16x115) baud; DSL clock: 2×17.664 MHz (VDSL) ... 16×2.208 MHz (ADSL ADC sampling rate
35.46895; 35.468			PAL		8×4.43361875 MHz of the PAL colorburst (color subcarrier). Used in some microcontroller based PAL console emulators. See 28.6363 MHz for the corresponding NTSC systems.[31]
35.50			VGA		VGA pixel clock (VESA mode 720×400@85, hsync 37.9 kHz)
36.000			VGA/SDTV		Video Graphics Array pixel clock (VESA modes VGA 640×480@85 with hsync 43.3 kHz, SVGA 800×600@56 with hsync 35.2 kHz. Pixel clock for SDTV PAL/NTSC (FWVGA 960×480p@59.94, 960×576p@50).
36.864		576000	audio	Yes	UART clock allows integer division to common baud rates up to 115,200 (x16x20), 230,400 (x16x10), 460,800 (x16x5), 576,000 (x16x4). Audio clock allows integer division for 48 / 96 / 192 / 384 ksps. Allows integer division to 1.024 MHz, 32.768 kHz, 1.024 kHz, 1 kHz, 60 Hz, 50 Hz.
37.400					Used in some WiFi and Bluetooth systems.
38.400	3G	38400	DVB		UART clock; allows integer division to common baud rates (500×38,400 baud or 500×32×1,200 baud). Also used as a 3G reference clock, due to being a second (2×19.2 MHz) least common multiple of W-CDMA chip rate 3.84 MHz (5x) and 200 kHz channel raster (96x). Also used in some DVB receiver chipsets. Used as reference clock in some Bluetooth systems, DECT phones, WiFi.
38.88	DS1/T1/E1				Used in DS1/T1/E1 systems as a packet clock (2×19.44 MHz). Commonly available as TCXO and OCXO.
39.000	GSM/UMTS				3×13 MHz. Commonly used as a reference clock for GSM and UMTS handsets. (39 MHz is exactly 144 times the GSM bit rate). Available as TCXO.
39.33			SDTV		SDTV PAL 16:9 pixel clock (1024 WSWGA, 1024×576p@50), square pixels
40.000					Common CPU clock, WiFi, OFDM. FPU oscillator for Commodore A3630 card and found in dual band miniPCIe WiFi cards. VGA pixel clock (VESA mode SVGA 800×600@60 with hsync 37.9 kHz). Allows binary division to 10 MHz. Used with ESP8266 and ESP32 chips (26 MHz is also supported and seems more common). Used in some WiFi, Bluetooth and BLE, RFID/NFC, SimpleLink systems.
40.320		115200			UART clock; allows integer division to common baud rates. (350×115200 baud or 350×96×1,200 baud)
40.655	RC				40 MHz band, channel 50; radio-controlled models of cars, boats
40.665	RC				40 MHz band, channel 66; radio-controlled models of cars, boats
40.675	RC				40 MHz band, channel 51; radio-controlled models of cars, boats
40.680					common crystal in garage door remotes and other remote controls; multiply by 32/3 to 433.92 MHz
40.685	RC				40 MHz band, channel 52; radio-controlled models of cars, boats
40.695	RC				40 MHz band, channel 53; radio-controlled models of cars, boats
40.705	RC				40 MHz band, channel 70; radio-controlled models of cars, boats
40.715	RC				40 MHz band, channel 54; radio-controlled models of cars, boats
40.725	RC				40 MHz band, channel 55; radio-controlled models of cars, boats
40.735	RC				40 MHz band, channel 56; radio-controlled models of cars, boats
40.745	RC				40 MHz band, channel 74; radio-controlled models of cars, boats
40.755	RC				40 MHz band, channel 75; radio-controlled models of cars, boats
40.765	RC				40 MHz band, channel 57; radio-controlled models of cars, boats
40.775	RC				40 MHz band, channel 58; radio-controlled models of cars, boats
40.775	RC				40 MHz band, channel 77; radio-controlled models of cars, boats
40.785	RC				40 MHz band, channel 59; radio-controlled models of cars, boats
40.795	RC				40 MHz band, channel 79; radio-controlled models of cars, boats
40.805	RC				40 MHz band, channel 80; radio-controlled models of cars, boats
40.815	RC				40 MHz band, channel 81; radio-controlled models of cars, boats
40.825	RC				40 MHz band, channel 82; radio-controlled models of cars, boats
40.835	RC				40 MHz band, channel 83; radio-controlled models of cars, boats
40.875	RC				40 MHz band, channel 85; radio-controlled models of cars, boats
40.885	RC				40 MHz band, channel 86; radio-controlled models of cars, boats
40.915	RC				40 MHz band, channel 87; radio-controlled models of cars, boats
40.935	RC				40 MHz band, channel 93; radio-controlled models of cars, boats
40.945	RC				40 MHz band, channel 94; radio-controlled models of cars, boats
40.960					Allows binary division to 10 kHz (2^{12}×10 kHz)
40.975	RC				40 MHz band, channel 91; radio-controlled models of cars, boats
40.985	RC				40 MHz band, channel 92; radio-controlled models of cars, boats
40.985	RC				40 MHz band, channel 98; radio-controlled models of cars, boats
42.93			VGA		VGA pixel clock (GTF mode PAL 768×576@72, hsync 43.27 kHz)
43.16			VGA		VGA pixel clock (GTF mode VGA 640×480@100, hsync 50.9 kHz)
44.736	DS3	38400			DS3 data rate clock. UART clock; allows integer division to common baud rates. (1165×38400 baud or 1165×32×1200 baud)
44.90			VGA		VGA pixel clock (industry standard XGA 1024×768i@43, hsync 35.5 kHz)
45.1584		57600	audio		Used in CD-DA systems and CD-ROM drives; allows binary division to 44.1 kHz (1024×44.1 kHz), 22.05 kHz, and 11.025 kHz. 16x2.8224 MHz (DSD rate). UART clock allows integer division to common baud rates up to 57,600(×16×49) or 115,200(×8×49). Available as a TCXO. Frequencies also used are 11.2896 MHz, 16.9344 MHz, 22.5972 MHz and 33.8688 MHz.
45.51			VGA		VGA pixel clock (GTF mode PAL 768×576@75, hsync 45.15 kHz)
48.000	USB		VGA/HDTV		found in old VGA cards, High-speed USB (48 MHz × 10 = 480 Mbit/s). HDTV pixel clock (1280×1080i@25), variant compatible with CRT-based 31.250 kHz horizontal deflection HDTVs. Used in some WiFi and Bluetooth systems.
49.1520	FireWire		audio		Digital audio systems - DAT, MiniDisc, AC'97, sound cards; 1024×48 kHz (2^{10}×48 kHz); also used as bus reference clock in FireWire systems (with accuracy of 100 ppm). Twice the more-standard frequency of 24.576 MHz. 6x8.192 MHz. Available as TCXO.
49.408	DS1				32x1.544, the bit clock for DS1 systems (±32 ppm, ANSI T1.102).
49.450549			HDTV		HDTV NTSC pixel clock (1280×1080i@29.97, 1280×1080p@29.97); 49.5/1.001
49.500			HDTV		HDTV ATSC pixel clock (1280×1080i@25/30, 1280×1080p@24/25/30). VGA pixel clock (VESA 800×600@75, hsync 46.9 kHz)
49.830; 49.860; 49.890	RC				toy remote controls, walkie-talkies
50.000	Ethernet				Fast Ethernet (2×25 MHz), VGA pixel clock (VESA mode 800×600@72, hsync 48.1 kHz) PCI Express clock source, doubled to 100 MHz. Amigakit ZorRAM memory cards.
50.09	Amateur Radio				A common QRP frequency (6-meter band). Other crystal can be 50.4 MHz. 3rd overtone. See also 7.025 MHz.
51.840	SONET/SDH	115200	VGA		SONET/SDH STS-1/OC-1 frequency (with accuracy of 20 ppm); UART clock; allows integer division to common baud rates. (450×115200 baud or 450×96×1,200 baud); VGA pixel clock (GTF mode 768×576@85, hsync 51.42 kHz). Can be generated from 6.48 MHz xtal.
52.000					Used in some WiFi, WLAN and GSM systems.
52.416	modems	115200			UART clock; allows integer division to common baud rates. (455×115200 baud or 455×96×1,200 baud) and to modem and fax rates (936×56000, 1092×48000, 1560×33600, 1820×28800, 3640×14400, 4368×12000, etc.); also divides to some common audio frequencies (273×192000, 1092×48000)
53.125	Fibre Channel				Fibre Channel clock
54.000			PAL/NTSC/HDTV		Raspberry Pi 4 (BCM2711) main clock crystal (19.2 MHz for Raspberry Pi 3 and earlier). Clock for digital video systems (27 MHz is an exact multiple of the PAL and NTSC line frequencies). 2x the 27 MHz master clock for MPEG-2 video systems (see also 81 MHz). HDTV pixel clock (1440×1080i@25), variant compatible with CRT-based 31.250 kHz horizontal deflection HDTVs.
55.6319			HDTV		HDTV NTSC pixel clock (4:3 1440×1080i@29.97, 1440×1080p@23.976/29.97); 55.6875/1.001
55.6875			HDTV		HDTV ATSC pixel clock (4:3 1440×1080i@25/30, 1440×1080p@24/25/30)
56.30			VGA		VGA pixel clock (VESA mode SVGA 800×600@85, hsync 53.7 kHz)
56.448	modems	115200			2×28.224 MHz; used in some faxes and modems; UART clock, allows integer division to common baud rates (490×115200, 1024×38400, 2048×19200, etc.) and to modem and fax rates (1008×56000, 1160×48000, 1680×33600, 1960×28800, 3920×14400, 4704×12000, etc.); also divides to common audio frequencies (294×192000, 1176×48000, 1280×44100, 2560×22050, 5120×11025)
61.440	WCDMA/3G				Used in wireless base stations; 2x30.72 MHz
62.57			VGA		VGA pixel clock (GTF mode PAL 768×576@100, hsync 61.1 kHz)
65.00			VGA		VGA pixel clock (VESA mode XGA 1024×768@60, hsync 48.4 kHz)
66.667					common CPU clock, PCI bus clock
67.108864				Yes	2^{26} allows binary division to 1 Hz and 32.768 kHz. Real-time clock; also for DDS generators with 1 Hz step
68.18			VGA		VGA pixel clock (GTF mode SVGA 800×600@100, hsync 63.6 kHz)
70.656	DSL	38400			(2x35.328) UART clock; allows integer division to common baud rates. (128×552000 baud, 512×138000 baud, 920×38400 baud or 920×32×1,200 baud);DSL clock: 4×17.664 MHz (VDSL) ... 32×2.208 MHz (ADSL ADC sampling rate)
72.000			HDTV		HDTV pixel clock (FHD/2K 1920×1080i@25), variant compatible with CRT-based 31.250 kHz horizontal deflection HDTVs
74.1758242; 74.176			HDTV		HDTV NTSC pixel clock (HD/WXGA 1280×720p@23.976/29.97/59.94, 1920×1080i@29.97, 1920×1080p@23.976/29.97); 74.25/1.001; very common Multiply by 91/250 to get 27 MHz.
74.250			HDTV		HDTV ATSC pixel clock (HD/WXGA 1280×720p@24/25/30/50/60, 1920×1080i@25/30, 1920×1080p@24/25/30); very common; also 1920×1080i@25, variant compatible with CRT-based 31.250 kHz horizontal deflection HDTVs. Multiply by 4/11 to get 27 MHz.
75.0			VGA		VGA pixel clock (VESA mode XGA 1024×768@70, hsync 56.5 kHz)
77.760	SONET/SDH	115200			Used in SONET/SDH systems as a base reference clock that is multiplied to generate 622.08 MHz (×8) for OC-12 and 2488.32 MHz (×32) for OC-48, and it is a common clock rate for internal parallel data. Commonly available as TCXO and OCXO to meet stringent SONET/SDH accuracy requirements, but it can also be generated from 19.44 MHz reference multiplied by 4. UART clock; allows integer division to common baud rates. (675×115200 baud or 675×96×1,200 baud).
78.125	Ethernet				Gigabit Ethernet, multiplies to 10 GHz MAC-side bitrate, post-serdes; 78.125 MHz = 1/132 of 10.3125 GHz, 1/128 of 10.0 GHz; often generated from 19.53125 MHz xtal
78.8			VGA		VGA pixel clock (VESA mode XGA 1024×768@75, hsync 60.0 kHz)
80.000			audio		common CPU clock; used in some audio applications, available as TCXO. Allows binary division to 10 MHz.
80.566406	Ethernet				Gigabit Ethernet. Multiplies (×128) to 10.3125 GHz, copper wire bit rate. Can be generated from 20.141601 xtal.
81.000			PAL/NTSC/SDTV		Clock for digital video systems (27 MHz is an exact multiple of the PAL and NTSC line frequencies). 3x the 27 MHz master clock for MPEG-2 video systems (see also 81 MHz).
81.62			VGA		VGA pixel clock (GTF mode XGA+ 1152×864@60, hsync 53.70 kHz)
83.46			VGA		VGA pixel clock (GTF mode WXGA 1280×800@60, hsync 49.68 kHz)
85.86			VGA		VGA pixel clock (GTF mode FWXGA 1368×768@60, hsync 47.7 kHz)
88.75			VGA		VGA pixel clock (WXGA+ 1440×900@60)
92.160	WCDMA/3G				Used in wireless base stations; 3x30.72 MHz
94.5			VGA		VGA pixel clock (VESA mode XGA 1024×768@85, hsync 68.7 kHz)
98.901099			HDTV		HDTV NTSC pixel clock (1280×1080p@59.94); 2x49.450549, 99/1.001
99.000			HDTV		HDTV ATSC pixel clock (1280×1080p@50/60)
100.000					10^{8} allows decade division to 1 Hz and 1 kHz. PCI Express clock. Standard frequency, available as OCXO.
106.250	Fibre Channel				Fibre Channel clock for 1.0625 gigabaud rate
106.47			VGA		VGA pixel clock (GTF mode WXGA+ 1440×900@60, hsync 55.92 kHz)
106.5	radio				Used as an IF LO in microwave transceivers, e.g. on the amateur 10 GHz band. Multiplied by 96 to produce 10.224 GHz signal. Available as OCXO.
108.0			VGA		VGA pixel clock (VESA modes XGA+ 1152×864@75 with hsync 675 kHz, SXGA-/UVGA 1280×960@60 with hsync 60.0 kHz, SXGA 1280×1024@60 with hsync 64 kHz)
111.2638			HDTV		HDTV NTSC pixel clock (4:3 1440×1080p@59.94); 111.375/1.001
111.375			HDTV		HDTV ATSC pixel clock (4:3 1440×1080p@50/60); 2x55.6875
113.31			VGA		VGA pixel clock (GTF mode XGA 1024×768@100, hsync 81.4 kHz)
116	radio				Used as an IF local oscillator in 144 MHz transverters. Available as TCXO. Sometimes used as GPS-disciplined OCXO.
119.65			VGA		VGA pixel clock (GTF mode XGA+ 1152×864@85, hsync 77.1 kHz)
122.61			VGA		VGA pixel clock (GTF mode SXGA+ 1400×1050@60, hsync 65.22 kHz)
122.880	WCDMA/3G				Standard frequency, available as TCXO, VCXO. Used in wireless base stations; 4x30.72 MHz
124.54			VGA		VGA pixel clock (GTF mode SXGA-/UVGA 1280×960@72, hsync 72.07 kHz)
125.000	Ethernet				Gigabit Ethernet GMII GTXCLK clock, FDDI clock
129.86			VGA		VGA pixel clock (GTF mode SXGA-/UVGA 1280×960@75, hsync 75.15 kHz)
134.217728				Yes	2^{27} allows binary division to 1 Hz and 32.768 kHz. Real-time clock; also for DDS generators with 1 Hz step
135.0			VGA		VGA pixel clock (VESA mode SXGA 1280×1024@75, hsync 80.0 kHz)
143.47			VGA		VGA pixel clock (GTF mode XGA+ 1152×864@100, hsync 91.5 kHz)
147.14			VGA		VGA pixel clock (GTF mode WSXGA+ 1680×1050@60, hsync 65.22 kHz)
148.351648			HDTV		SMPTE 424, HDTV NTSC pixel clock (FHD/2K 1920×1080p@59.94); 148.5/1.001. Multiply by 91/500 to get 27 MHz.
148.5			HDTV/HDMI		SMPTE 424, HDTV ATSC pixel clock (FHD/2K 1920×1080p@50/60); 2x74.25. VGA pixel clock (VESA mode 1280×960@85, hsync 85.9 kHz). Standard HDMI pixel clock (4k YUV 4:2:0@30). Multiply by 4/22 to get 27 MHz.
149.34			VGA		VGA pixel clock (GTF mode SXGA+ 1400×1050@72, hsync 78.77 kHz)
150.000					common reference oscillator, TCXO
153.600	WCDMA/3G				Standard frequency. Used in wireless base stations, available as TCXO, VCXO. 5x30.72 MHz. Popular frequency of SAW filters for intermediate frequency in microwave systems.
154.0			VGA		VGA pixel clock (WUXGA 1920×1200@60)
155.520	SONET/SDH				3×51.840 MHz (SONET STS-1 frequency) for OC-3 SONET/SDH clock. Can be generated from 19.44 MHz xtal.
155.85			VGA		VGA pixel clock (GTF mode SXGA+ 1400×1050@75, hsync 82.2 kHz)
156.25	Ethernet				10 Gigabit Ethernet clock, 64-bit signal Multiplies by 64 to 10.0 GHz (MAC-side serial bitrate) or by 66 to 10.3125 GHz (wire-side serial bitrate, after encoding). In video-over-IP systems, often with 148.5 and 148.351648 MHz.
157.5			VGA		VGA pixel clock (VESA mode SXGA 1280×1024@85, hsync 91.1 kHz)
161.132812	Ethernet				Gigabit Ethernet, 66-bit signal. Multiplies (×64) to 10.3125 GHz, copper wire bit rate. Can be generated from 20.141601 xtal.
162.0			VGA		VGA pixel clock (VESA mode UXGA 1600×1200@60, hsync 75.0 kHz)
165.0			HDMI/DVI		HDMI/DVI serial clock for 1080p@60 (TMDS encoding)
175.5			VGA		VGA pixel clock (VESA mode UXGA 1600×1200@65, hsync 81.3 kHz)
178.99			VGA		VGA pixel clock (GTF mode SXGA-/UVGA 1280×960@100, hsync 101.7 kHz)
179.26			VGA		VGA pixel clock (GTF mode SXGA+ 1400×1050@85, hsync 93.76 kHz)
184.320	WCDMA/3G				Used in wireless base stations; 6x30.72 MHz
187.50	Ethernet				10x18.75 MHz; see also 75 MHz, 150 MHz
189.0			VGA		VGA pixel clock (VESA mode UXGA 1600×1200@70, hsync 87.5 kHz)
190.96			VGA		VGA pixel clock (GTF mode SXGA 1280×1024@100, hsync 108.5 kHz)
193.16			VGA		VGA pixel clock (GTF mode WUXGA 1920×1200@60, hsync 74.52 kHz)
196.608	E1				Allows division to 1 kHz (3×2^16×1 kHz). Bit clock for E1 systems. 48x4.096 MHz, 96x2.048 MHz.
202.5			VGA		VGA pixel clock (VESA mode UXGA 1600×1200@75, hsync 93.8 kHz)
204.8			VGA		VGA pixel clock (VESA mode 1792×1344@60, hsync 83.6 kHz)
214.39			VGA		VGA pixel clock (GTF mode SXGA+ 1400×1050@100, hsync 111.2 kHz)
218.3			VGA		VGA pixel clock (VESA mode 1856×1392@60, hsync 86.3 kHz)
229.5			VGA		VGA pixel clock (VESA mode UXGA 1600×1200@85, hsync 106.3 kHz)
234.0			VGA		VGA pixel clock (VESA mode 1920×1440@60, hsync 90.0 kHz)
234.59			VGA		VGA pixel clock (QHD 2560×1440@60)
261.0			VGA		VGA pixel clock (VESA mode 1792×1344@75, hsync 106.3 kHz)
268.435456				Yes	2^{28} allows binary division to 1 Hz and 32.768 kHz. Real-time clock; also for DDS generators with 1 Hz step
280.64			VGA		VGA pixel clock (GTF mode UXGA 1600×1200@100, hsync 127.1 kHz)
288.0			VGA		VGA pixel clock (VESA mode 1856×1392@75, hsync 112.5 kHz)
297.0			VGA/HDMI		VGA pixel clock (VESA mode 1920×1440@75, hsync 112.5 kHz). High-speed HDMI pixel clock (2x148.5, 4k YUV 4:2:0@60, RGB@30).
311.04	SONET/SDH				6×51.840 MHz (SONET STS-1 frequency) SONET/SDH clock.
312.5	Ethernet				Gigabit Ethernet, multiplies (×32) to 10 GHz MAC-side bitrate, or (×33) to 10.3125 GHz copper-wire serial bitrate; often generated from 19.53125 MHz xtal
312.787			VGA		VGA pixel clock (21.5:9 3440×1440@60)
			radio (ISM)		SAW resonators for Chinese 315 MHz ISM band RF remote control fobs
322.265625	Ethernet				Gigabit Ethernet, PHY, 66-bit signal. Multiplies (×32) to 10.3125 GHz, copper wire bit rate. Can be generated from 20.141601 xtal.
336.375			VGA		VGA pixel clock (QHD 2560×1440@85)
			radio (ISM)		SAW resonators for 433.92 MHz ISM band RF remote control fobs
448.5			VGA		VGA pixel clock (21.5:9 3440×1440@85)
483.120			VGA		VGA pixel clock (QHD 2560×1440@120)
531.52			VGA		VGA pixel clock (4K UHD 3440×1440@100)
533.250			VGA		VGA pixel clock (4K UHD 3840×2160@60)
586.586			VGA		VGA pixel clock (QHD 2560×1440@144)
622.08	SONET/SDH				12×51.840 MHz (SONET STS-1 frequency) for OC-12 SONET/SDH clock.
625.0	Ethernet				Gigabit Ethernet, multiplies (×16) to 10 GHz MAC-side bitrate
644.160			VGA		VGA pixel clock (21.5:9 3440×1440@120)
678.100			VGA		VGA pixel clock (QHD 2560×1440@165)
1075.804			VGA		VGA pixel clock (4K UHD 3840×2160@120)
