= 48,000 Hz =

48 kHz, a common sampling rate

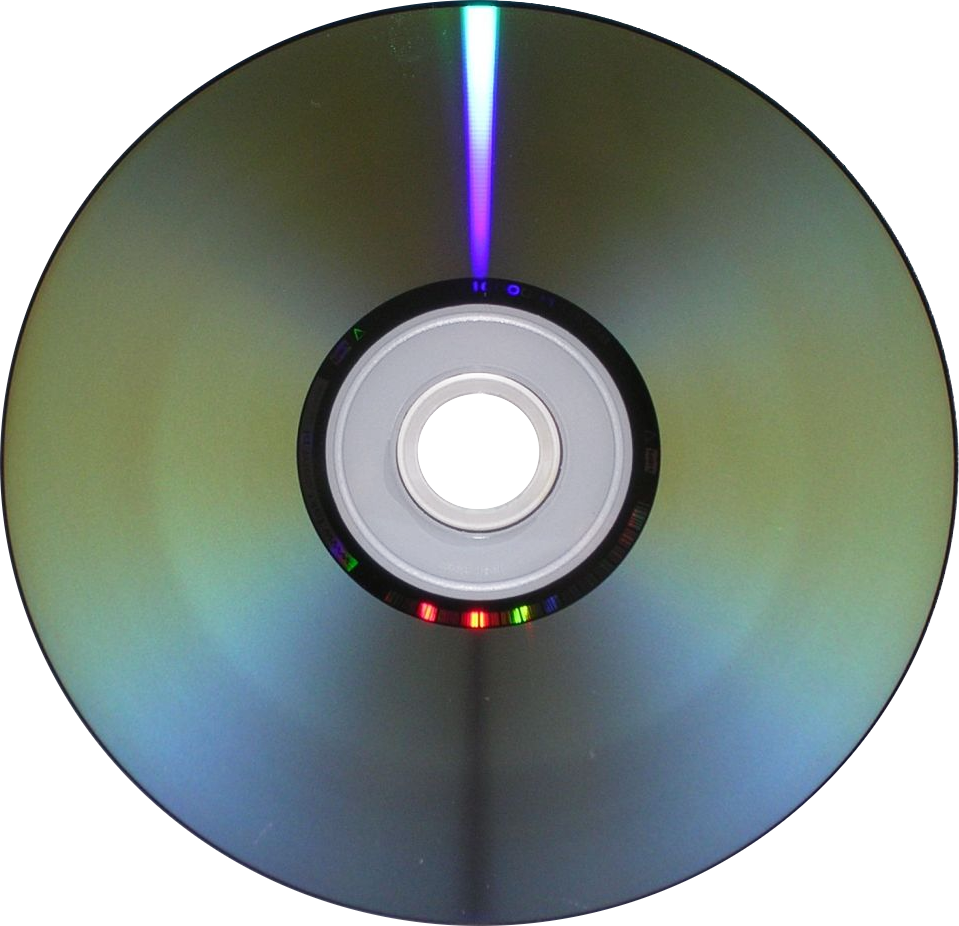
The DVD format uses the 48 kHz sampling rate, and its doublings.

In digital audio, 48,000 Hz (also represented as 48 kHz or DVD Quality) is a common sampling rate. It has become the standard for professional audio and video.

48 kHz is evenly divisible by 24, a common frame rate for media, such as film, unlike 44.1 kHz. (Note: 44.1 kHz divided by 24 is not an integer (1837.5), which can lead to synchronization issues.)

== Origin ==
In the late 1970s, digital audio didn't yet have a standard for a sampling rate, with proprietary sampling rates ranging from 32 kHz up to 50 kHz.

As the use of digital audio increased, it became apparent that standardization on a single sampling rate was needed, which started to be worked on in 1981.

A variety of requirements had to be considered before deciding on a sampling rate. Principally, the sampling rate had to be at least double the maximal frequency carried (as per the Nyquist–Shannon sampling theorem) — at least 40 kHz to roughly cover all human-audible frequencies without aliasing distortion.

The sampling rates under consideration ranged between 45 kHz and 60 kHz. 60 kHz would have been the ideal sampling rate for film and video use because it would have a complete absence of leap frames, but from the professional audio-only recording perspective, it was considered wastefully high.

Decca Records first adopted the 48 kHz sampling rate in 1978 with the Decca Digital Audio Recorder.

To synchronize digital audio with television and film, there were five sampling rates available that had leap frames but were not too high, which were as follows: 45, 48, 50, 52.5, and 54 kHz. European television chose 48 kHz due to them already broadcasting in 32 kHz, which corresponded to a 3:2 ratio, which made conversion easy, with no leap frames. As for NTSC television, they had two choices: 48, or 50 kHz. Ultimately, they chose 48 kHz, because there would be a leap frame every 5 frames, unlike 50 kHz, which would have a leap frame every 3 frames of color and b/w NTSC video, because European television was already using 48 kHz, and because it was easy to synchronize with 24 frames per second, a common frame rate used in television, and video.

== Differences between 48 and 44.1 kHz ==
Humans can't easily hear the difference between 48, 44.1 kHz, and other similar sampling rates. One benefit that 44.1 kHz provides is that it is easier to work with, requiring fewer computer resources, simply because it has fewer samples per second, which also results in smaller file sizes. However, a 44.1 kHz to 48 kHz conversion process may cause quality loss (a 48 to 44.1 kHz conversion process is also), because 48 kHz divided by 44.1 kHz is not an integer.

It is generally recommended to use 48 kHz for digital publishing, and 44.1 kHz for CD publishing.

48 kHz does have a slightly higher Nyquist frequency than 44.1 kHz, which allows for a more gradual low-pass filter to be used without introducing aliasing to the encoded signal.

48 kHz is the default standard for operating system level sample-rate conversion for audio output, such as Windows, Linux and Android. For audio input and audio recording, MS Windows and Linux (ALSA) tend to use 44.1 kHz as sampling rate for compatibility purpose, but Android tend to use 48 kHz as sampling rate.

== Other common rates ==
Other sampling rates include:

- 44.1 kHz (also known as CD Quality): Originated in the late 1970s with PCM adaptors, and is still a common sampling rate to this day, mostly due to CD's adoption of this sampling rate, defined in the Red Book standard in 1980.

A comparison of several sampling rates, depicting their dynamic ranges.

- 44,056 Hz: An obsolete sampling rate used in Color NTSC.
- 88.2, 96 kHz and above: High sampling rates are used for recording and production as they can improve audio signal processing and help reduce aliasing during recording. These higher rates are also used for audiophile listening but haven't become the standard for listening, as their principal advantage is being able to encode frequencies above those humans can hear, using more storage and computer resources.

== See also ==
- High-resolution audio
