= Channel 80 =

Channel 80 has been used regarding:

- A computer interface: see AT Attachment.
- A former NTSC-M channel, removed from television use in 1983 and originally used by stations in North America which broadcast on 866-872 MHz. In the United States, channels 70-83 served primarily as a "translator band" of small repeater transmitters rebroadcasting existing stations.

== Stations ==
Many of these stations are now defunct, the rest have been moved to lower frequencies:

- CHAU-TV (TVA Carleton) rebroadcaster CJAO-TV-1 Percé, Québec, replaced by CHAU-TV-5 on channel 13 and later channel 11.
- KATU-TV (ABC Portland) rebroadcaster K80BL Rockaway, Oregon was moved to K47CD channel 47.
- KRQE-TV (CBS Albuquerque) rebroadcasters K80AC Truth or Consequences, New Mexico and K80BH Farmington, New Mexico were moved to K25HV (now K25HV-D) channel 25 and K21AX channel 21 respectively.
- KAMR-TV (NBC Albuquerque) rebroadcaster K80AB Tucumcari, New Mexico was moved to K50CX channel 50.
- KFDA-TV (CBS Amarillo) rebroadcaster K80AU Memphis, Texas was moved to K42AL channel 42.
- KOIN-TV (CBS Portland) rebroadcaster K80BA The Dalles, Oregon moved to K64BK channel 64.
- KSL-TV (NBC Salt Lake City) rebroadcaster K80AN Fillmore, Utah moved to K38GT channel 38.
- KTVX-TV (ABC Salt Lake City) rebroadcaster K80AI Ely, Nevada has moved to K30CN channel 30.
- KUED-TV (PBS Salt Lake City) rebroadcaster K80BY Kanab, Utah moved to K07ES channel 7.
- KWTV-TV (CBS Oklahoma City) rebroadcaster K80BT Seiling, Oklahoma moved to K57EA channel 57.
- WJAC-TV (NBC Johnstown) rebroadcaster W80AD Moorefield, West Virginia has moved to W54BG channel 54.
