= Sampling (signal processing) =

Measurement of a signal at discrete time intervals

Signal sampling representation. The continuous signal S(t) is represented with a green colored line, while the discrete samples are indicated by the blue vertical lines.

In signal processing, sampling is the reduction of a continuous-time signal to a discrete-time signal. A common example is the conversion of a sound wave to a sequence of "samples". A sample is a value of the signal at a point in time and/or space. (Note: This definition differs from the term's usage in statistics, which refers to a set of such values. For example, "number of samples" in signal processing is roughly equivalent to "sample size" in statistics.) The original signal can be reconstructed from a sequence of samples, up to the Nyquist limit, by passing the sequence of samples through a reconstruction filter. A sampler is a subsystem or operation that extracts samples from a continuous signal. A theoretical ideal sampler produces samples equivalent to the instantaneous value of the continuous signal at the desired points.

== Theory ==
Functions of space, time, or any other dimension can be sampled, and similarly in two or more dimensions.

For functions that vary with time, let $s(t)$ be a continuous function (or "signal") to be sampled, and let sampling be performed by measuring the value of the continuous function every $T$ seconds, which is called the sampling interval or sampling period. Then the sampled function is given by the sequence:

$s(nT)$, for integer values of $n$.

The sampling frequency or sampling rate, $f_s$, is the average number of samples obtained in one second, thus $f_s=1/T$, with the unit samples per second, sometimes referred to as hertz; for example, 48 kHz is 48,000 samples per second.

Reconstructing a continuous function from samples is done by interpolation algorithms. The Whittaker–Shannon interpolation formula is mathematically equivalent to an ideal low-pass filter whose input is a sequence of Dirac delta functions that are modulated (multiplied) by the sample values. When the time interval between adjacent samples is a constant $(T)$, the sequence of delta functions is called a Dirac comb. Mathematically, the modulated Dirac comb is equivalent to the product of the comb function with $s(t)$. That mathematical abstraction is sometimes referred to as impulse sampling.

Most sampled signals are not simply stored and reconstructed. The fidelity of a theoretical reconstruction is a common measure of the effectiveness of sampling. That fidelity is reduced when $s(t)$ contains frequency components whose cycle length (period) is less than 2 sample intervals (see Aliasing). The corresponding frequency limit, in cycles per second (hertz), is $0.5$ cycle/sample × $f_s$ samples/second = $f_s/2$, known as the Nyquist frequency of the sampler. Therefore, $s(t)$ is usually the output of a low-pass filter, functionally known as an anti-aliasing filter. Without an anti-aliasing filter, frequencies higher than the Nyquist frequency will influence the samples in a way that is misinterpreted by the interpolation process.

== Practical considerations ==
In practice, the continuous signal is sampled using an analog-to-digital converter (ADC), a device with various physical limitations. This results in deviations from the theoretically perfect reconstruction, collectively referred to as distortion.

Various types of distortion can occur, including:

- Aliasing. Some amount of aliasing is inevitable because only theoretical, infinitely long functions can have no frequency content above the Nyquist frequency. Aliasing can be made arbitrarily small by using a sufficiently large order of the anti-aliasing filter.
- Aperture error results from the fact that the sample is obtained as a time average within a sampling region, rather than just being equal to the signal value at the sampling instant. In a capacitor-based sample and hold circuit, aperture errors are introduced by multiple mechanisms. For example, the capacitor cannot instantly track the input signal, and the capacitor can not instantly be isolated from the input signal.
- Jitter or deviation from the precise sample timing intervals.
- Noise, including thermal sensor noise, analog circuit noise, etc..
- Slew rate limit error, caused by the inability of the ADC input value to change sufficiently rapidly.
- Quantization as a consequence of the finite precision of words that represent the converted values.
- Error due to other non-linear effects of the mapping of input voltage to converted output value (in addition to the effects of quantization).

Although the use of oversampling can completely eliminate aperture error and aliasing by shifting them out of the passband, this technique cannot be practically used above a few GHz, and may be prohibitively expensive at much lower frequencies. Furthermore, while oversampling can reduce quantization error and non-linearity, it cannot eliminate these entirely. Consequently, practical ADCs at audio frequencies typically do not exhibit aliasing or aperture error, and are not limited by quantization error. Instead, analog noise dominates. At RF and microwave frequencies, where oversampling is impractical and filters are expensive, aperture error, quantization error and aliasing can be significant limitations.

Jitter, noise, and quantization are often analyzed by modeling them as random errors added to the sample values. Integration and zero-order hold effects can be analyzed as a form of low-pass filtering. The non-linearities of either ADC or DAC are analyzed by replacing the ideal linear function mapping with a proposed nonlinear function.

== Applications ==
=== Audio sampling ===
Digital audio systems typically employ pulse-code modulation (PCM) to encode sound as a series of discrete samples of the electrical level of an analog audio signal. Analog signals are captured (encoded) as PCM samples in analog-to-digital conversion (ADC), and reproduced (decoded) using digital-to-analog conversion (DAC). The encoding used for the storage and transmission of digitised sound data within the system may differ.

When it is necessary to capture audio covering the entire 20–20,000 Hz range of human hearing such as when recording music or many types of acoustic events, audio waveforms are typically sampled at 44.1 kHz (CD), 48 kHz, 88.2 kHz, or 96 kHz. The approximately double-rate requirement is a consequence of the Nyquist theorem. Sampling rates higher than about 50 kHz to 60 kHz cannot supply more usable information for human listeners. Early professional audio equipment manufacturers chose sampling rates in the region of 40 to 50 kHz for this reason.

There has been an industry trend towards sampling rates well beyond the basic requirements, such as 96 kHz and even 192 kHz. Even though ultrasonic frequencies are inaudible to humans, recording and mixing at higher sampling rates is effective in eliminating the distortion that can be caused by foldback aliasing. Conversely, ultrasonic sounds may interact with and modulate the audible part of the frequency spectrum (intermodulation distortion), degrading the fidelity. One advantage of higher sampling rates is that they can relax the low-pass filter design requirements for ADCs and DACs, but with modern oversampling delta-sigma-converters, this advantage is less important.

The Audio Engineering Society recommends 48 kHz sampling rate for most applications, but gives recognition to 44.1 kHz for CD and other consumer uses, 32 kHz for transmission-related applications, and 96 kHz for higher bandwidth or relaxed anti-aliasing filtering. Both Lavry Engineering and J. Robert Stuart state that the ideal sampling rate would be about 60 kHz, but since this is not a standard frequency, recommend 88.2 or 96 kHz for recording purposes. A more complete list of common audio sample rates is:

Sampling rate	Use
5,512.5 Hz	Supported in Flash.
8,000 Hz	Telephone and encrypted walkie-talkie, wireless intercom and wireless microphone transmission; adequate for human speech but without sibilance (ess sounds like eff (/s/, /f/)).
11,025 Hz	One quarter the sampling rate of audio CDs; used for lower-quality PCM, MPEG audio and for audio analysis of subwoofer bandpasses.
16,000 Hz	Wideband frequency extension over standard telephone narrowband 8,000 Hz. Used in most modern VoIP and VVoIP communication products.
22,050 Hz	One half the sampling rate of audio CDs; used for lower-quality PCM and MPEG audio and for audio analysis of low-frequency energy. Suitable for digitizing early 20th century audio formats such as 78s and AM radio.
32,000 Hz	miniDV digital video camcorder, video tapes with extra channels of audio (e.g. DVCAM with four channels of audio), DAT (LP mode), Germany's Digitales Satellitenradio, NICAM digital audio, used alongside analogue television sound in some countries. High-quality digital wireless microphones. Suitable for digitizing FM radio.
37,800 Hz	CD-XA audio
44,055.9 Hz	Used by digital audio locked to NTSC color video signals (3 samples per line, 245 lines per field, 59.94 fields per second = 29.97 frames per second).
44,100 Hz	Audio CD, also most commonly used with MPEG-1 audio (VCD, SVCD, MP3). Originally chosen by Sony because it could be recorded on modified video equipment running at either 25 frames per second (PAL) or 30 frame/s (using an NTSC monochrome video recorder) and cover the 20 kHz bandwidth thought necessary to match professional analog recording equipment of the time. A PCM adaptor would fit digital audio samples into the analog video channel of, for example, PAL video tapes using 3 samples per line, 588 lines per frame, 25 frames per second.
47,250 Hz	world's first commercial PCM sound recorder by Nippon Columbia (Denon)
48,000 Hz	The standard audio sampling rate used by professional digital video equipment such as tape recorders, video servers, vision mixers and so on. This rate was chosen because it could reconstruct frequencies up to 22 kHz and work with 29.97 frames per second NTSC video, as well as 25 frame/s, 30 frame/s and 24 frame/s systems. With 29.97 frame/s systems, it is necessary to handle 1601.6 audio samples per frame, delivering an integer number of audio samples only every fifth video frame. Also used for sound with consumer video formats like DV, digital TV, DVD, films, and many video streaming platforms such as YouTube and Netflix. The lossless audio such as FLAC can select either 44100 Hz, 48000 Hz or higher. The professional serial digital interface (SDI) and High-definition Serial Digital Interface (HD-SDI) used to connect broadcast television equipment together use this audio sampling frequency. Most professional audio gear uses 48 kHz sampling, including mixing consoles, and digital recording devices.
50,000 Hz	First commercial digital audio recorders from the late 70s from 3M and Soundstream.
50,400 Hz	Sampling rate used by the Mitsubishi X-80 digital audio recorder.
64,000 Hz	Uncommonly used, but supported by some hardware and software.
88,200 Hz	Sampling rate used by some professional recording equipment when the destination is CD (multiples of 44,100 Hz). Some pro audio gear uses (or is able to select) 88.2 kHz sampling, including mixers, EQs, compressors, reverb, crossovers, and recording devices.
96,000 Hz	DVD-Audio, some LPCM DVD tracks, BD-ROM (Blu-ray Disc) audio tracks, HD DVD (High-Definition DVD) audio tracks, and Hi-Res Audio. Some professional recording and production equipment is able to select 96 kHz sampling. This sampling frequency is twice the 48 kHz standard commonly used with audio on professional equipment.
176,400 Hz	Sampling rate used by HDCD recorders and other professional applications for CD production. Four times the frequency of 44.1 kHz.
192,000 Hz	DVD-Audio, some LPCM DVD tracks, BD-ROM (Blu-ray Disc) audio tracks, and HD DVD (High-Definition DVD) audio tracks, High-Definition audio recording devices, Hi-Res Audio, and audio editing software. This sampling frequency is four times the 48 kHz standard commonly used with audio on professional video equipment.
352,800 Hz	Digital eXtreme Definition, used for recording and editing Super Audio CDs, as 1-bit Direct Stream Digital (DSD) is not suited for editing. 8 times the frequency of 44.1 kHz.
384,000 Hz	Maximum sample rate available in common software.
2,822,400 Hz	SACD, 1-bit delta-sigma modulation process known as Direct Stream Digital, co-developed by Sony and Philips.
5,644,800 Hz	Double-Rate DSD, 1-bit Direct Stream Digital at 2× the rate of the SACD. Used in some professional DSD recorders.
11,289,600 Hz	Quad-Rate DSD, 1-bit Direct Stream Digital at 4× the rate of the SACD. Used in some uncommon professional DSD recorders.
22,579,200 Hz	Octuple-Rate DSD, 1-bit Direct Stream Digital at 8× the rate of the SACD. Used in rare experimental DSD recorders. Also known as DSD512.
45,158,400 Hz	Sexdecuple-Rate DSD, 1-bit Direct Stream Digital at 16× the rate of the SACD. Used in rare experimental DSD recorders. Also known as DSD1024. (Note: Even higher DSD sampling rates exist, but the benefits of those are likely imperceptible, and the size of those files would be humongous.)

==== Bit depth ====
Audio is typically recorded at 8-, 16-, and 24-bit depth; which yield a theoretical maximum signal-to-quantization-noise ratio (SQNR) for a pure sine wave of, approximately; 49.93 dB, 98.09 dB, and 122.17 dB. CD quality audio uses 16-bit samples. Thermal noise limits the true number of bits that can be used in quantization. Few analog systems have a signal-to-noise ratio (SNR) exceeding 120 dB. However, digital signal processing operations can have very high dynamic range; consequently, it is common to perform mixing and mastering operations at 32-bit floating-point precision and then convert to 16- or 24-bit for distribution.

==== Speech sampling ====
Speech signals, i.e., signals intended to carry only human speech, can usually be sampled at a much lower rate. For most phonemes, almost all of the energy is contained in the 100 Hz – 4 kHz range, allowing a sampling rate of 8 kHz. This is the sampling rate used by nearly all telephony systems, which use the G.711 sampling and quantization specifications.

=== Video sampling ===
Standard-definition television (SDTV) uses either 720 by 480 pixels (US NTSC 525-line) or 720 by 576 pixels (UK PAL 625-line) for the visible picture area.

High-definition television (HDTV) uses 720p (progressive), 1080i (interlaced), and 1080p (progressive, also known as Full-HD).

In digital video, the temporal sampling rate is defined as the frame rate – or rather the field rate – rather than the notional pixel clock. The image sampling frequency is the repetition rate of the sensor integration period. Since the integration period may be significantly shorter than the time between repetitions, the sampling frequency can be different from the inverse of the sample time:

- 50 Hz – PAL video
- 60 / 1.001 Hz ~= 59.94 Hz – NTSC video

Video digital-to-analog converters operate in the megahertz range (from ~3 MHz for low-quality composite video scalers in early game consoles, to 250 MHz or more for the highest-resolution VGA output).

When analog video is converted to digital video, a different sampling process occurs, this time at the pixel frequency, corresponding to a spatial sampling rate along scan lines. A common pixel sampling rate is:

- 13.5 MHz – CCIR 601, D1 video

Spatial sampling in the other direction is determined by the spacing of scan lines in the raster. The sampling rates and resolutions in both spatial directions can be measured in units of lines per picture height.

Spatial aliasing of high-frequency luma or chroma video components shows up as a moiré pattern.

=== 3D sampling ===
The process of volume rendering samples a 3D grid of voxels to produce 3D renderings of sliced (tomographic) data. The 3D grid is assumed to represent a continuous region of 3D space. Volume rendering is common in medical imaging; X-ray computed tomography (CT/CAT), magnetic resonance imaging (MRI), positron emission tomography (PET) are some examples. It is also used for seismic tomography and other applications.

The top two graphs depict Fourier transforms of two different functions that produce the same results when sampled at a particular rate. The baseband function is sampled faster than its Nyquist rate, and the bandpass function is undersampled, effectively converting it to baseband. The lower graphs indicate how identical spectral results are created by the aliases of the sampling process.

== Undersampling ==
When a bandpass signal is sampled slower than its Nyquist rate, the samples are indistinguishable from samples of a low-frequency alias of the high-frequency signal. That is often done purposefully in such a way that the lowest-frequency alias satisfies the Nyquist criterion, because the bandpass signal is still uniquely represented and recoverable. Such undersampling is also known as bandpass sampling, harmonic sampling, IF sampling, and direct IF to digital conversion.

== Oversampling ==
Oversampling is used in most modern analog-to-digital converters to reduce the distortion introduced by practical digital-to-analog converters, such as a zero-order hold instead of idealizations like the Whittaker–Shannon interpolation formula.

== Complex sampling ==
Complex sampling (or I/Q sampling) is the simultaneous sampling of two different, but related, waveforms, resulting in pairs of samples that are subsequently treated as complex numbers. (Note: Sample pairs are also sometimes viewed as points on a constellation diagram.) When one waveform, $\hat s(t)$, is the Hilbert transform of the other waveform, $s(t)$, the complex-valued function, $s_a(t)\triangleq s(t)+i\cdot\hat s(t)$, is called an analytic signal, whose Fourier transform is zero for all negative values of frequency. In that case, the Nyquist rate for a waveform with no frequencies ≥ B can be reduced to just B (complex samples/sec), instead of $2B$ (real samples/sec). (Note: When the complex sample rate is B, a frequency component at 0.6 B, for instance, will have an alias at −0.4 B, which is unambiguous because of the constraint that the pre-sampled signal was analytic. Also see Aliasing § Complex sinusoids.) More apparently, the equivalent baseband waveform, $s_a(t)\cdot e^{-i2\pi\frac{B}{2}t}$, also has a Nyquist rate of $B$, because all of its non-zero frequency content is shifted into the interval $[-B/2,B/2]$.

Although complex-valued samples can be obtained as described above, they are also created by manipulating samples of a real-valued waveform. For instance, the equivalent baseband waveform can be created without explicitly computing $\hat s(t)$, by processing the product sequence, $\left[s(nT)\cdot e^{-i2\pi\frac{B}{2}Tn}\right]$, (Note: When s(t) is sampled at the Nyquist frequency (1/T = 2B), the product sequence simplifies to $\left [s(nT)\cdot (-i)^n\right ].$) through a digital low-pass filter whose cutoff frequency is $B/2$. (Note: The sequence of complex numbers is convolved with the impulse response of a filter with real-valued coefficients. That is equivalent to separately filtering the sequences of real parts and imaginary parts and reforming complex pairs at the outputs.) Computing only every other sample of the output sequence reduces the sample rate commensurate with the reduced Nyquist rate. The result is half as many complex-valued samples as the original number of real samples. No information is lost, and the original $s(t)$ waveform can be recovered, if necessary.

== See also ==
- Crystal oscillator frequencies
- Downsampling
- Upsampling
- Sample abundance
- Multidimensional sampling
- In-phase and quadrature components and I/Q data
- Sample rate conversion
- Digitizing
- Sample and hold
- Beta encoder
- Kell factor
- Bit rate
- Normalized frequency
