= Blackmer gain cell =

Transistor amplifier

The Blackmer gain cell is an audio frequency voltage-controlled amplifier (VCA) circuit with an exponential control law. It was invented and patented by David E. Blackmer between 1970 and 1973. The four-transistor core of the original Blackmer cell contains two complementary bipolar current mirrors that perform log-antilog operations on input voltages in a push-pull, alternating fashion. Earlier log-antilog modulators using the fundamental exponential characteristic of a p–n junction were unipolar; Blackmer's application of push-pull signal processing allowed modulation of bipolar voltages and bidirectional currents.

The Blackmer cell, which has been manufactured since 1973, is the first precision VCA circuit that was suitable for professional audio. As early as the 1970s, production Blackmer cells achieved 110 dB control range with total harmonic distortion of no more than 0.01% and very high compliance with ideal exponential control law. The circuit was used in remote-controlled mixing consoles, signal compressors, microphone amplifiers, and dbx noise reduction systems. In the 21st century, the Blackmer cell, along with Douglas Frey's Operational Voltage Controlled Element (OVCE), remains one of two integrated VCA topologies that are still widely used in studio and stage equipment.

== Development and applications ==
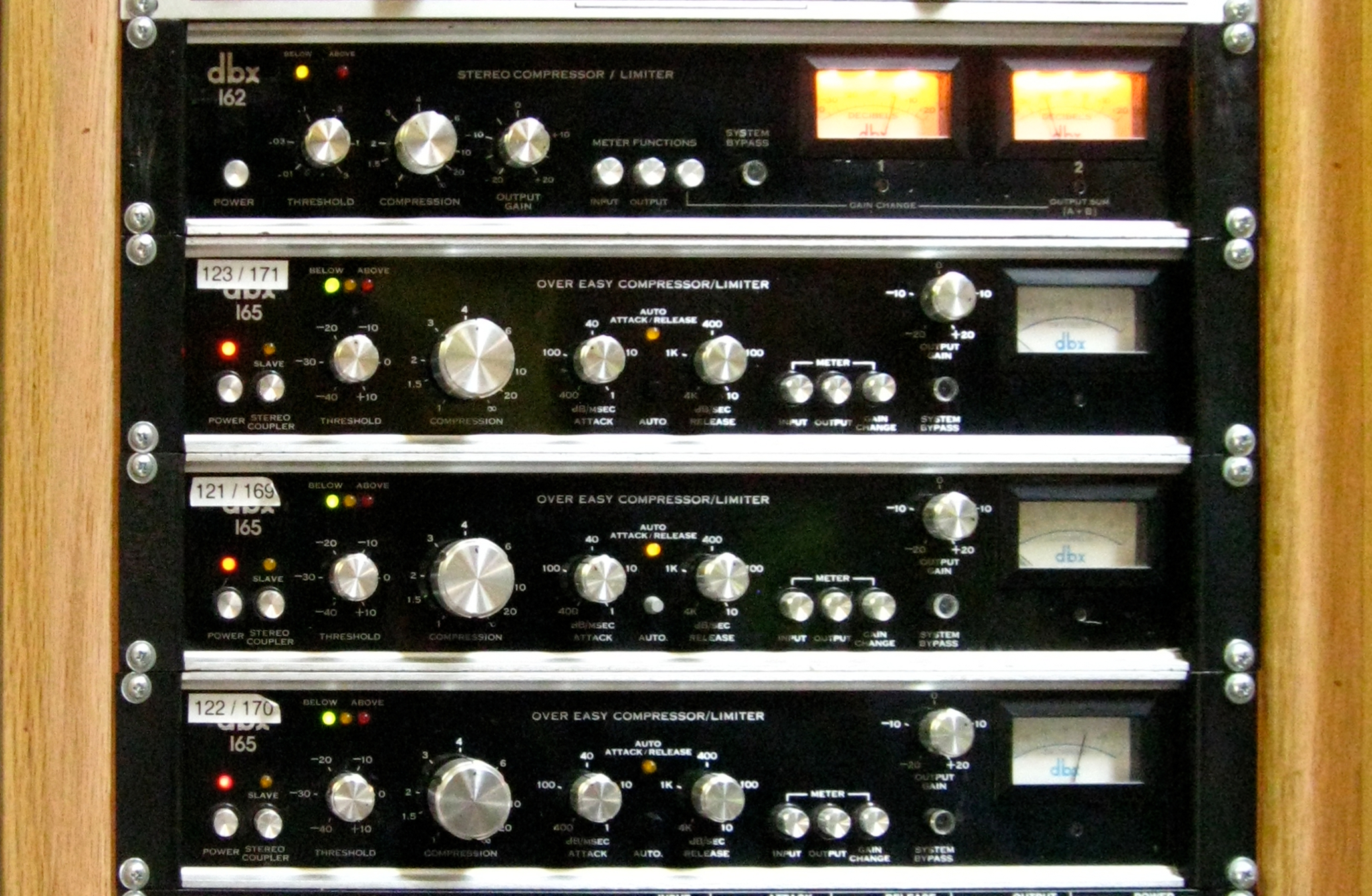
Professional audio signal processors by dbx, Inc., based on the Blackmer gain cell. Dbx, founded and owned by Blackmer, was the first company to commercialize his inventions

In the 1960s, American recording studios adopted multitrack recording. Narrow tracks of multitrack recorders were noisier than wide tracks of their predecessors; mixing down many narrow tracks further degraded the signal-to-noise ratio of master tapes. Mixing became a complex process requiring the precisely timed operation of numerous controls and faders, which were too numerous to operate manually. These problems of early multitrack studios created a demand for professional-grade noise reduction and console automation. At the core of both of these functions was the voltage-controlled amplifier (VCA).

The earliest solid-state VCA topology was an attenuator rather than an amplifier; it employed a junction field-effect transistor in voltage-controlled resistance mode. These attenuators, which were state of the art in the early 1970s, were successfully used in professional Dolby A and consumer Dolby B noise reduction systems but did not meet all of the demands of mixing engineers. In 1968, Barrie Gilbert invented the Gilbert cell that was quickly adopted by radio and analog computer designers but lacked the precision required for studio equipment. Between 1970 and 1973, David E. Blackmer invented and patented the four-transistor multiplying log-antilog cell, targeting professional audio.^{1989b}

The Blackmer cell was more precise and had a greater dynamic range than prior VCA topologies, but it required well-matched complementary transistors of both polarity types that could not yet be implemented in a silicon integrated circuit (IC). Contemporary junction isolation technology offered poorly performing p-n-p transistors so integrated circuit designers had to use n-p-n transistors alone. The Gilbert and Dolby circuits were easily integrated in silicon but the Blackmer cell had to be assembled from tediously selected, precision-matched, discrete transistors. To ensure isothermal operation, these metal-can transistors were firmly held together with a thermally conductive ceramic block and insulated from the environment with a steel can. The first hybrid integrated circuits of this type, the "black can" dbx202, were manufactured by Blackmer's company in 1973. Five years later, Blackmer released the improved dbx202C "gold can" hybrid IC; total harmonic distortion decreased from 0.03% to 0.01% and gain control range increased from 110 dB to 116 dB. In 1980, Blackmer released a version designed by Bob Adams, the dbx2001. Unlike earlier Blackmer cells that operated in lean class AB, the dbx2001 operated in class A. Distortion dropped to less than 0.001% but the noise and dynamic range of the dbx2001 were inferior to those of class AB circuits. This first generation of Blackmer VCAs had a very long service life; as of 2002, analogue consoles built around the original dbx202 "cans" were still being used in professional recording studios.

By 1980, complementary bipolar ICs became possible and Allison Research released the first monolithic Blackmer gain cell IC. The ECG-101, which was designed by Paul Buff, contained only the core of a modified Blackmer cell – a set of eight matched transistors – and was intended for pure class A operation. It had a unique sonic signature that had almost no undesirable, odd-order harmonics and was easier to stabilize than the original Blackmer cell. In 1981 dbx, Inc. released their own monolithic IC, the dbx2150/2151/2155, which was designed by Dave Welland, the future co-founder of Silicon Labs. The three numeric designations denoted three grades of the same chip; 2151 being the best, 2155 the worst; the middle-of-the-line 2150 was the most widely used version. The eight-pin single-in-line package (SIP8) assured good isolation between inputs and outputs, and became the industry standard that was used in the later dbx2100, THAT2150 and THAT2181 ICs. These circuits, like the original hybrid dbx ICs, were a small-volume niche product that was used exclusively in professional analogue audio. Typical applications include mixing consoles, compressors, noise gates, duckers, de-essers and state variable filters. The dbx noise reduction system, which used the Blackmer cell, had limited success in semi-professional market and failed in consumer markets, losing to Dolby C. The only mass market where dbx achieved substantial use was the North American Multichannel Television Sound, which was introduced in 1984 and operating until the end of analogue television broadcasting in 2009.

In the 21st century, professional Blackmer ICs are manufactured by THAT Corporation – a direct descendant of Blackmers' dbx, Inc. – using dielectric isolation technology. As of April 2020, the company offered one dual-channel and two single-channel Blackmer ICs, and four "analog engine" ICs containing Blackmer cells that are controlled by Blackmer RMS detectors.

== Operation ==
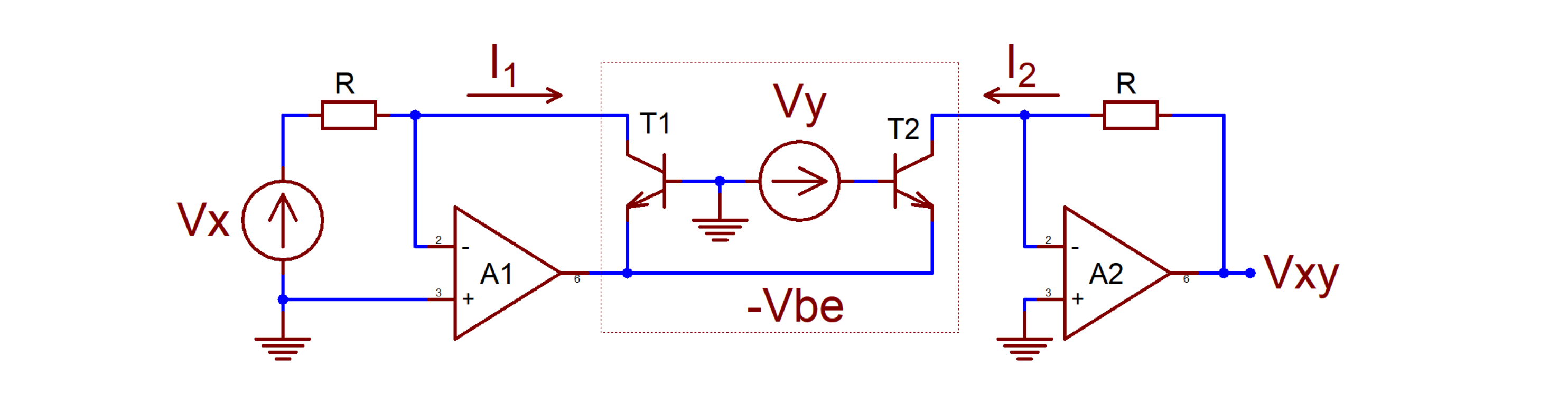
Basic, single-quadrant log-antilog converter

=== Log-antilog principle ===
The Blackmer cell is a direct descendant of a two-transistor log-antilog circuit, itself a derivative of the simple current mirror. Normally, the bases of two transistors of a mirror are tied together to ensure the collector current I_{2} of the output transistor T2 exactly mirrors the collector current I_{1} of the input transistor T1. Additional positive or negative bias voltage V_{Y} applied between the bases of T1 and T2 converts the mirror into a current amplifier or attenuator. Scale factor or current gain follows the exponential Shockley formula:

$I_2 = I_1 e^{ \frac { V_Y } {\phi_t} },$

where $\phi_t$ it the thermal voltage, proportional to absolute temperature, and equal to 25.852 mV at 300 K.

The control voltage V_{Y} is usually referenced to ground, either with one terminal grounded or with both terminals driven differentially with zero volts common-mode voltage. This requires lowering emitter potential below ground, usually with an operational amplifier A1 that also converts input voltage V_{X} into input current I_{1} (so-called transdiode configuration). A second operational amplifier A2 converts output current I_{2} into output voltage V_{XY}.

In mathematics, logarithm function is defined for positive argument only. A log-antilog circuit built with NPN transistors will only accept positive input voltage V_{X} or only negative V_{X} in the case of PNP transistors. This is unacceptable in audio applications, which have to handle alternating current (AC) signals. Adding direct current (DC) offset to audio signals, as was proposed by Embley in 1970, will work at a fixed gain setting but any changes in gain will modulate the output DC offset.

=== Four-transistor Blackmer core ===
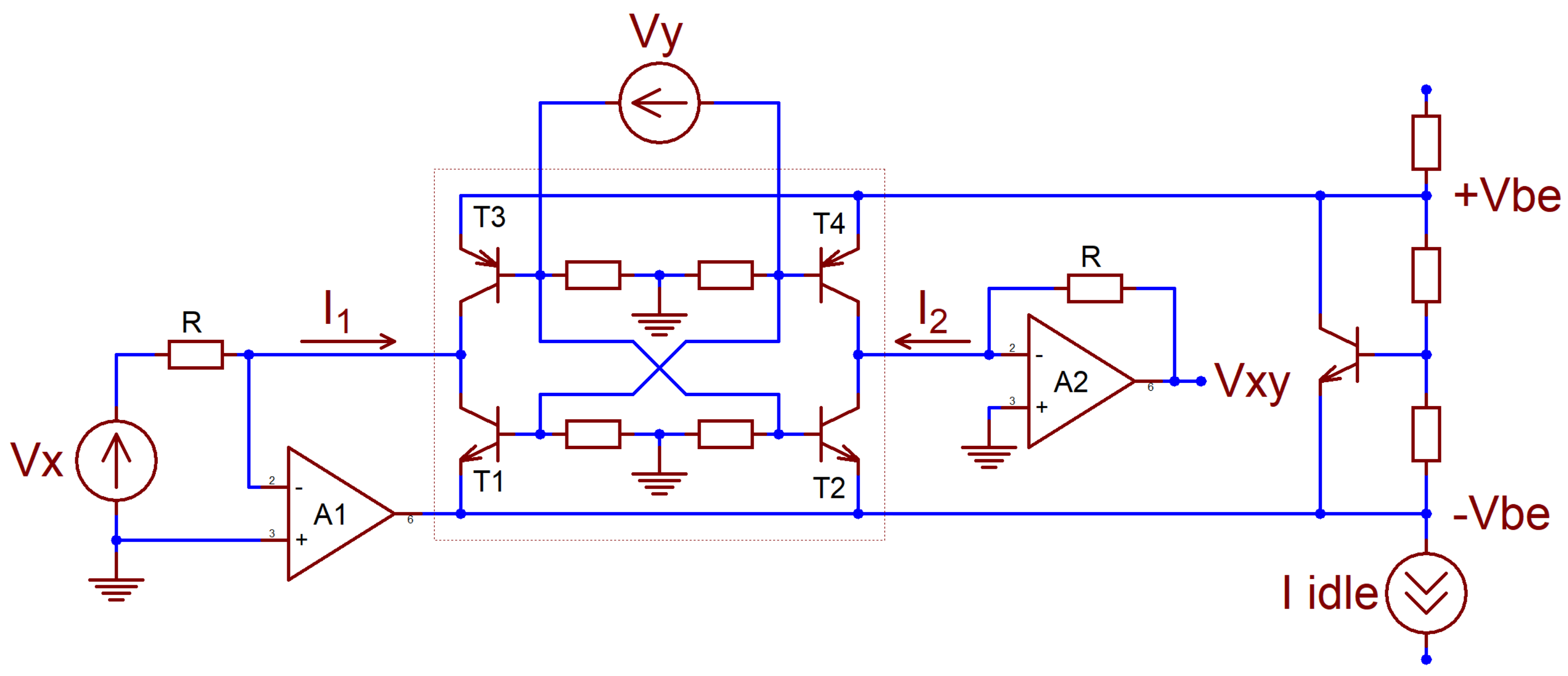
The complete Blackmer gain cell, regulated with a V_{BE} multiplier

The Blackmer circuit consists of two complementary log-antilog VCAs. Its four-transistor core – the Blackmer cell proper – combines two complementary current mirrors that are wired back-to-back and operate in a push-pull fashion. The lower NPN-type mirror (T1, T2) sinks input current I_{1}; the upper PNP-type mirror (T3, T4) is sourcing input current I_{1} in the opposite direction. A V_{BE} multiplier thermally coupled to the core maintains around 1.5 V (2 V_{BE}) across its power supply terminals and regulates its idle current (2 mA or less in production monolithic ICs). Signal voltage is applied to terminals V_{X} and control voltage to terminals V_{Y}. Operational amplifiers A1 and A2 perform same voltage-to-current and current-to-voltage converter functions as their counterparts in a unipolar log-antilog circuit, and maintain virtual ground potential at the core's input and output nodes. Values of feedback resistors are usually set at 10 kOhm (100 kOhm in early hybrid ICs); they must be equal to ensure unity gain at zero control voltage. Potentials of all of the core's nodes other than V_{y} are almost independent of input signals, which is common to all current-mode circuits, which process signal currents rather than voltages.

When the control voltage V_{Y}=0 the core operates as a bidirectional current follower, replicating the input current I_{1} to output current I_{2}. In cores biased to pure class A, both mirrors contribute their shares of I_{2} simultaneously; in cores biased to class AB, this is only true for very small values of V_{X} and I_{1}. At higher V_{X} one of the mirrors of a class AB core shuts down and all output current I_{2} is sunk or sourced with the other mirror, which is active. With positive (negative) V_{Y} current through the active mirror or both mirrors in class A increases (decreases) exponentially, exactly as it does in a single-quadrant log-antilog circuit:

$$I_2 = I_1 e^{ \frac { V_Y } {\phi_t} } = { \frac { V_X } { R} } e^{ \frac { V_Y } {\phi_t} },$$
$V_{XY} = V_X e^{ \frac { V_Y } {\phi_t} },$ assuming equal values of R in A1 and A2

At 300 K, the slope of the exponential control law equals 0.33 dB/mV (or 3.0 mV/dB) for either negative or positive values of V_{X}. In practice, the slope is inconveniently steep and the core is usually decoupled from real-world control voltages with an active attenuator. This attenuator, or any other source of V_{Y}, must have very low noise and very low output impedance, which is only attainable in op-amp-based circuits. A single-ended V_{Y} drive is almost as good as a symmetric balanced drive; having two V_{Y} terminals allows control of the cell by two independent single-ended voltages.

The gain of the Blackmer cell has an inverse relationship with temperature; the hotter the IC, the lower the slope of exponential control law. For example, V_{Y}=+70 mV at 300 K translates to a gain of 10 times or +20 dB. As the die temperature rises to 310 K, gain at V_{Y}=+70 mV decreases by 0.66 dB to +19.3 dB; at maximum operating temperature of 343 K (70 °C) it drops to +17.2 dB. In practice this shortcoming is easily overcome by using a control scale that is proportional to absolute temperature (PTAT). In dbx noise reduction systems and THAT Corp's analog engine, this is ensured by the physics of the Blackmer RMS detector, which is PTAT by design. In old mixing consoles, the same effect was achieved using positive temperature coefficient (PTC) thermistors.

=== Eight-transistor core ===
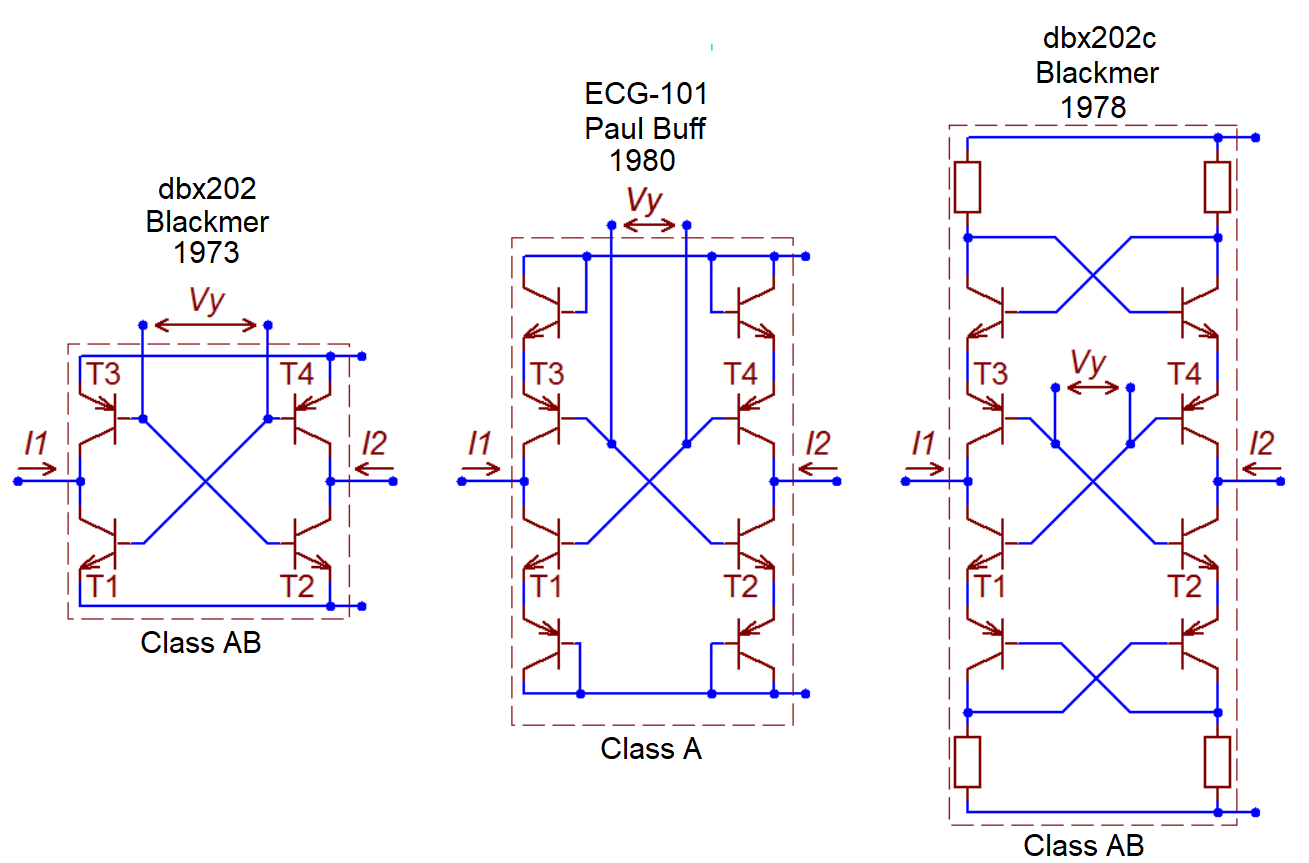
Basic four-transistor Blackmer core, Paul Buff eight-transistor core, and the eight-transistor core with logarithming error correction

Mismatches of PNP and NPN transistors of a basic Blackmer cell are usually balanced with trimming. Alternatively, transistors can be balanced by design via inclusion of opposite-type, diode-wired transistors into each leg of the core. Each of the four legs of the modified core contains one NPN and one PNP type transistor; although they are still functionally asymmetrical, the degree of asymmetry is greatly reduced. The slope of exponential control law is exactly half of that of the four-transistor cell. This improvement was invented by recording engineer Paul Conrad Buff and manufactured since 1980 as the monolithic ECG-101 IC by Allison Research and the identical TA-101 by Valley People.

=== Eight-transistor core with log error correction ===
Parasitic base and emitter resistances distort current-voltage characteristics of real-world transistors, introducing logarithming error and distorting the output signal. To improve precision beyond what was attainable through the use of oversized core transistors, Blackmer suggested using his eight-transistor core with interleaved local feedback loops. The circuit, which was first produced as hybrid dbx202C in 1978 and as monolithic 2150/2151/2155 ICs in 1981, minimizes log-error distortion when the value of each feedback resistor equals the sum of equivalent emitter resistances on NPN and PNP transistors. A simple model predicts this approach neutralizes all sources of logarthming error but in reality, feedback cannot compensate for current crowding effects, which can only be reduced by increasing transistor sizes. Cores of monolithic Blackmer ICs are so large effective feedback resistor values are less than one ohm.

=== Parallel wiring of cores ===
Blackmer cores, being current-in, current-out devices, can easily be connected in parallel. Wiring identical cores in parallel increases input and output currents proportionally to the number of cores, however, noise current rises only as the square root of same number. Paralleling four cores, for example, increases signal current four times and increases noise current two times, improving signal-to-noise ratio by 6 dB. The first production circuit of this type, the hybrid dbx202x, contained eight parallel cores made up of discrete transistors; the hybrid THAT2002 contained four monolithic THAT2181 dies.

== Performance ==
The design of a Blackmer cell IC is a compromise favoring a specific combination of distortion, noise and dynamic range of gain settings. These properties are critical for professional audio application and are interrelated and cannot be perfected simultaneously. The choice of circuit simplicity (built-in, wafer-level trimming) or lowest distortion (external in-circuit trimming) is also fixed at die level.

=== Distortion ===
Distortion of a class AB Blackmer core has three main sources:

- Logarithming error due to finite parasitic resistances;
- Asymmetry of top (PNP) and bottom (NPN) transistors;
- Nonlinearity of input voltage-to-current converter (A1).

The first two sources are contained within the core and define distortion patterns at low frequencies. Both are suppressed by increasing transistor sizes, although effective neutralization of logarithming error is only possible in improved eight-transistor cores. Large transistors have lesser parasitic resistances and are less sensitive to inevitable random area mismatches. Temporal mismatches caused by thermal gradients are avoided by careful placement of core transistors and surrounding components on the IC. The residual mismatch of PNP and NPN mirrors is compensated for with trimming, usually by injecting a very small current into one of the core's two output transistors. This creates a small, asymmetric biasing voltage of a few millivolts or less, which should ideally be proportional to absolute temperature. In monolithic ICs, this is ensured by using a thermally-coupled PTAT source of bias current. Wafer-level trimming suffers from random shifts during subsequent die packaging; wafer-trimmed ICs have maximum rated THD from 0.01% (best grade) to 0.05% (worst grade) at 1V RMS input. Further reductions to 0.001% THD require in-circuit fine trimming, which is normally performed once using a precision THD analyzer and needs no further adjustments.

The output amplifier A2 operates at fixed closed-loop gain, drives a benign constant-impedance load and does not degrade distortion. The input amplifier A1 drives a nonlinear feedback loop wrapped around the core and must remain stable at any possible combination of V_{X} and V_{Y}. To avoid crossover distortion, A1 must have very high bandwidth and a fast slew rate but at treble audio frequencies, its nonlinearity becomes the dominant factor of distortion as the open-loop gain of A1 decreases. This type of distortion is common to operational amplifiers with voltage output; in production ICs, it is effectively nulled by replacing the voltage-output amplifier with a current-output transconductance amplifier.

=== Noise ===
Estimation and measurement of signal-to-noise ratio is difficult and ambiguous because of the complex, non-linear relationship between currents, voltages and noise. At zero or very small input signals, the core has a very low noise floor. At high input signals, this residual noise is swamped by far larger modulation noise containing products of shot noise, thermal noise from the core's transistors, and external noises that are injected into V_{Y} terminals. Higher input signals cause greater modulation: "noise follows the signal", in a nonlinear fashion.

At moderate gain or attenuation settings, noise of the core – assuming noise-free surrounding circuitry – is determined by collector current shot noise, which is proportional to the square root of emitter current. Thus lowest noise is attained in class AB cores with very small idle currents. Designs for lowest distortion require pure class A operation at the cost of higher noise. For example, in THAT Corp's ICs, increase of idle current from 20 μA (class AB) to 750 μA (class A) causes a rise in no-signal noise floor by 17 dB; in dbx, Inc. hybrid "cans" the difference was either 10 or 16 dB. In practice, there is no perfect compromise; the choice of low-noise class AB or low-distortion class A depends on application.

Noise of operational amplifiers A1 and A2 is only material at very low or very high gain settings. In class AB ICs by THAT Corporation, noise of A2 becomes dominant at gain of −30 dB or less, the noise of A2 becomes dominant at gains of +20 dB or more. At high output levels, the noise signature is dominated by noises injected via control terminals, even when proper care has been taken to suppress their sources.

=== Injection of noise and distortion via control terminals ===
Blackmer cells are particularly sensitive to interference at control terminals. Any signal arriving at V_{Y} port, either a useful control voltage or unwanted noise, directly modulates the output signal at a rate of 0.33 dB/mV for a four-transistor cell or 0.17 dB/mV for an eight-transistor cell. 1 mV of random noise or hum results in either 4% or 2% modulation, degrading signal-to-noise ratio to absolutely unacceptable values. Contamination of V_{Y} with input signal V_{X} causes not noise, but unacceptably high harmonic distortion.

Circuits driving V_{Y} terminals must be designed as thoroughly as professional-grade audio paths are. In practice, V_{Y} terminals are usually interfaced to external control signals with low-noise operational amplifiers directly, ensuring the lowest possible output impedance; low-cost amplifiers like the NE5532 are an inferior but acceptable alternative to quieter but more expensive models. Amplifiers of this class are characterized by audio frequency noise density of a few nV/$\sqrt{}$Hz which, although low, will swamp other noise sources at high signal levels.

=== Control range ===
In class AB cores, off-state suppression of input signal, which marks the lowest end of control scale, reaches 110 dB at 1 kHz but deteriorates at higher audio frequencies due to parasitic capacitances. Single-in-line IC packages, otherwise obsolete, perform well in this respect due to the relatively long distance between input and output pins. Care should be taken to prevent capacitive coupling from V_{X} input to A1 non-inverting input. In class A cores, the control scale is inevitably narrower due to higher residual noise level.

=== Control voltage feedthrough ===
In class AB cores, at low frequencies, feedthrough of control voltage V_{Y} into the output signal has two principal sources: mismatches in core transistors that are reduced by increasing transistor sizes, and feedthrough of input bias current. Any DC component of V_{X}, and input offset voltage of amplifier A1 inject DC components into input current I_{1}, which are replicated at the output and modulated by the core along with the AC input signal. These sources of feedthrough can be neutralized with capacitive coupling, leaving one undesirable DC component, input bias current of A1. This current can be reduced to a few nanoamperes with bias-canceling input stages. At high frequencies, V_{Y} is coupled to the output node directly via collector-base capacitances of the core transistors. Differential V_{Y} drive does not eliminate the problem because of the different capacitances of PNP and NPN transistors. The residual V_{Y} feedthrough can be nulled by feedforward injection of inverted V_{Y} into the output node via a small-value capacitor, restoring capacitive symmetry of the core.

Class A cores, in general, are more prone to control voltage feedthrough owing to thermal gradients in the core (in class AB same gradients manifest themselves as distortion). Early class A ICs used as muting gates produced audible, low-frequency "thumps" but subsequent improvements in production ICs significantly reduced the undesirable feedthrough.
