= Dbx =

dbx or DBX may refer to:

- dbx (debugger), a Unix source-level debugger
- dbx (company), a professional audio recording equipment company
  - dbx (noise reduction), a noise reduction system invented by dbx, Inc.
- .dbx, the file extension for Microsoft Outlook Express data files
- direct byte execution, a tagline used for Jazelle, one of the execution states found in ARM processors
- DBX, annual Dropbox developer conference and NYSE ticker symbol for Dropbox
- Aston Martin DBX, an automobile model

In music:

- DBX, the stage name of turntablist Danny Marquez, formerly of Trik Turner
- DBX, an alias of American minimal techno artist Daniel Bell
- DBX, the Dave Brockie Experience
- DBX, an English group composed of producers Pete Kirtley and Sacha Collision, and singer-songwriter John James Newman
