= True RMS converter =

Electronic circuit

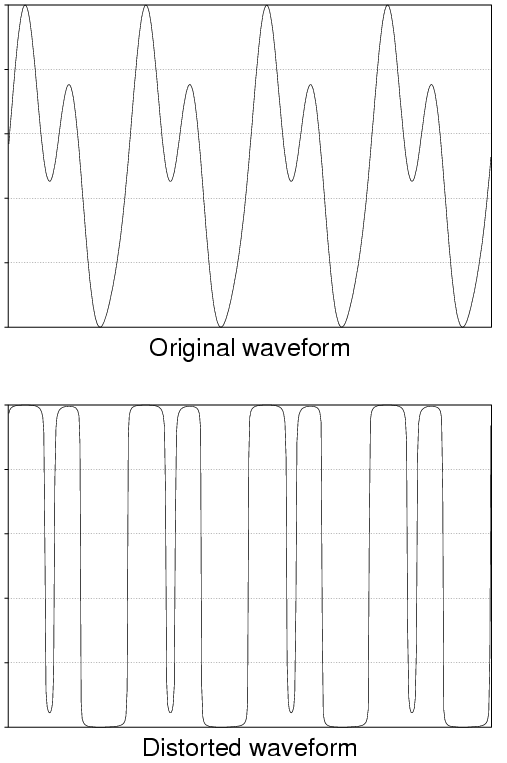
Distortion of a waveform

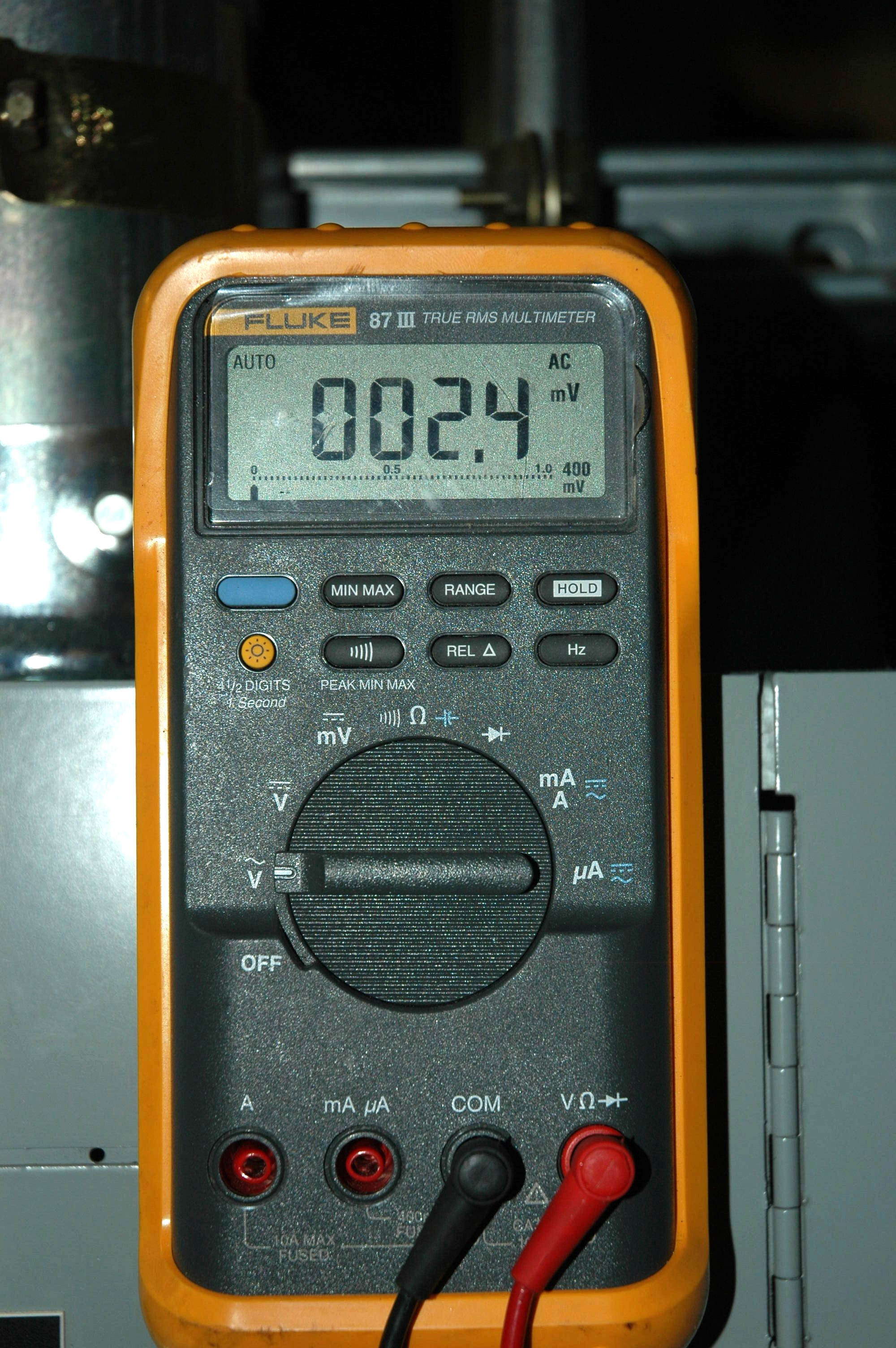
True RMS Multimeter

For the measurement of an alternating current the signal is often converted into a direct current of equivalent value, the root mean square (RMS). Simple instrumentation and signal converters carry out this conversion by filtering the signal into an average rectified value and applying a correction factor. The value of the correction factor applied is only correct if the input signal is sinusoidal.

True RMS provides a more correct value that is proportional to the square root of the average of the square of the curve, and not to the average of the absolute value. For any given waveform, the ratio of these two averages is constant and, as most measurements are made on what are (nominally) sine waves, the correction factor assumes this waveform; but any distortion or offsets will lead to errors. To achieve this, a true RMS converter requires a more complex circuit.

== Digital RMS converters ==
If a waveform has been digitized, the correct RMS value may be calculated directly. Most digital and PC-based oscilloscopes include a function to give the RMS value of a waveform. The precision and the bandwidth of the conversion is entirely dependent on the analog to digital conversion. In most cases, true RMS measurements are made on repetitive waveforms, and under such conditions digital oscilloscopes (and a few sophisticated sampling multimeters) are able to achieve very high bandwidths as they sample at much higher sampling frequency than the signal frequency to obtain a stroboscopic effect.

== Thermal converters ==
The power dissipated across a resistive load is the same for any waveform of a given RMS voltage. For example any 1V RMS signal will dissipate exactly 1 W of power across a 1 Ω resistor regardless of whether it is a 1V DC constant voltage, a sine wave with a √2V peak voltage, or any other waveform no matter how complex or simple. This is the principle used by thermal converters to measure the RMS voltage of signals.

The signal under test (SUT) is applied across a resistive heating element and the temperature rise produced in response is compared against a known signal to get a measurement of the RMS voltage. This is typically done by way of a second identical heating element controlled by a differential amplifier in feedback with the aim of applying a voltage across it such that its temperature always remains equal to the heater driven by the SUT. The voltage from the amplifier that results is the DC equivalent of the RMS voltage from the SUT.

Thermal true RMS converters when properly constructed have extremely low error even at bandwidth and waveshape extremes. For this reason thermal RMS converters are used frequently by standards organizations such as the NIST for measuring AC signals with extreme accuracy. Due to the physical size and challenging nature of designing and building this style of RMS converter it's rarely seen in handheld digital voltmeters but thermal-based RMS power meters are often used in microwave test equipment and are the norm at millimeter wave (MMW) frequencies.

== Analog electronic converters ==
Analog electronic circuits may use:

- An analog multiplier in a specific configuration which multiplies the input signal by itself (squares it), averages the result with a capacitor, and then calculates the square root of the value (via a multiplier/squarer circuit in the feedback loop of an operational amplifier).
- A full-wave precision rectifier circuit to create the absolute value of the input signal, which is fed into a log amplifier, doubled and fed into an exponential amplifier as a means of deriving the square-law transfer function x^{2} = e^{2 ln |x|}, and then the time-average and square root are performed, similarly to above.
- A log-domain precision detector (Blackmer RMS detector) also computes logarithm of absolute value of the input signal, however, time-averaging is performed on the logarithm, rather than square, of input. Output is logarithmic (decibel scale), with a fast attack but slow and linear decay.
- A field-effect transistor may be used to directly create the square-law transfer function, before time-averaging.

Unlike thermal converters they are subject to bandwidth limitations which makes them unsuitable for most RF work. The circuitry before time averaging is particularly crucial for high-frequency performance. The slew rate limitation of the operational amplifier used to create the absolute value (especially at low input signal levels) tends to make the second method the poorest at high frequencies, while the FET method can work close to VHF.
