= DVGA =

DVGA may refer to:

- Digital Variable Gain Amplifier
- Double-size VGA display resolution
