= Betrayal, Fear, Anger, Hatred =

EP by Nomeansno
- Released: 1981
- Recorded: March 1981
- Genre: Punk rock, noise rock
- Length: 13:50
- Label: Wrong Records
- Producer: Nomeansno

Nomeansno singles and EPs chronology
Look, Here Come the Wormies / SS Social Service (1980)	Betrayal, Fear, Anger, Hatred (1981)	You Kill Me (1984)

Betrayal, Fear, Anger, Hatred is the first EP by Canadian punk rock band Nomeansno. Released in 1981, it and the "Look, Here Come the Wormies / SS Social Service" 7-inch split single from the previous year are the two official Nomeansno releases from their origins recording in their parents' basement before becoming a live band. Originally self-released in a limited vinyl run, the EP since has been re-released by the band's Wrong Records imprint on 7-inch and included on reissues of the band's 1982 debut album Mama.

== Background and recording ==
Brothers Rob and John Wright began recording original songs in 1979 on an early TASCAM four-track recorder in their parents' basement, which they called "Subterranean Studios." Although they would later develop their hardcore punk influence, their early songs reflected their interest in musical experimentation and influence from progressive rock, jazz, and new wave. Writing for Trouser Press, critic Ira Robbins described their early recordings as "Devo on a jazz trip, Motörhead after art school, or Wire on psychotic steroids."

Following their first release, the "Look, Here Come the Wormies / SS Social Service" split 7-inch of 1980, the brothers recorded four songs for a new EP in March 1981. Guest Eric Sinclair contributed saxophone on "Approaching Zero." The song "Forget Your Life" would later be re-recorded with full-band instrumentation on The Day Everything Became Nothing EP of 1988.

== Release ==
The band initially issued the EP themselves in a 300-copy pressing. Although they did not intend for the EP to have a name, it became known by the four words which appear on its cover. Subsequently, it has been officially named Betrayal, Fear, Anger, Hatred.

The initial press of the EP quickly went out of print and became a collector's item. Wrong Records, the band's own imprint, repressed the EP on 7-inch vinyl in 1991. The band re-issued their 1982 debut album Mama on CD with the four Betrayal, Fear, Anger, Hatred songs as additional tracks. Subsequent editions of Mama, such as the 2004 CD edition and 2013 LP edition, included the four EP tracks as well.

== Reception ==
Unacknowledged by the musical press at the time of its original release, the EP was praised retrospectively for its successful execution of Nomeansno's incipient sound. Canadian rock journalists Barclay, Jack, and Schnieder wrote that the EP "shows the first indications of the musical and lyrical intensity for which NoMeansNo would become known." They conclude that the EP showcases "the total commitment to honesty that quickly earned them the respect of the wider punk community. For Trouser Press, Robbins called the EP a "statement of purpose". A critic writing for Maximumrocknroll described the EP as containing "4 great songs". The tracks were described by Allmusic's Laurie Mercer as "relatively straightforward", but Mercer also commented on "Forget Your Life"'s contrast between apparently nihilistic lyrics and positive and upbeat sentiment.

== Track listing ==
1. "Try Not to Stutter" – 2:47
2. "I'm All Wet" – 2:46
3. "Approaching Zero" – 2:20
4. "Forget Your Life" – 4:55

== Personnel ==
- John Wright – vocals, drums, keyboards, percussion, artwork
- Rob Wright – vocals, bass, guitar, artwork
- Eric Sinclair – saxophone (track 3)
