= Look, Here Come the Wormies / SS Social Service =

Single by Nomeansno, Mass Appeal
- Released: 1980
- Recorded: March 1980
- Studio: Subterranean Studios, Victoria, British Columbia
- Genre: Punk rock, noise rock, new wave
- Length: 9:11
- Label: Self-released

Nomeansno singles and EPs singles chronology
"Look, Here Come the Wormies / SS Social Service" (1980)	"'Betrayal, Fear, Anger, Hatred'" (1981)

Look, Here Come the Wormies / SS Social Service is a split 7-inch vinyl single with one song each from Victoria, British Columbia punk rock bands Nomeansno and Mass Appeal, artist Ray Carter's (formally known as MANDAD) first audio work. The record was independently issued in a limited run in 1980 and has not been re-released. It is the first Nomeansno record and one of two, along with the Betrayal, Fear, Anger, Hatred EP, from the band's home-recording era before they became a live band.

== Background and recording ==
Brothers Rob and John Wright began recording original songs in 1979 on an early TASCAM four-track recorder in their parents' basement, which they called "Subterranean Studios." Although they would later develop their hardcore punk influence, their early songs reflected their interest in musical experimentation and influence from progressive rock, jazz, and new wave. Writing for Trouser Press, critic Ira Robbins described their early recordings as "Devo on a jazz trip, Motörhead after art school, or Wire on psychotic steroids."

The 33 1/3 r.p.m. 7-inch vinyl was recorded in Subterranean Studios in March 1980. The John Wright-penned "Look, Here Come the Wormies", was their first song issued as Nomeansno. "S.S. Social Service," a song by Ray Carter's one-off Mass Appeal project, was recorded with John Wright playing drums, Rob Wright playing guitar and Ray Carter on bass and vocals. The songs were mastered at Legacy Studios in Victoria.

== Release and reception ==
The bands issued the two songs themselves in a 500-copy split 7-inch vinyl pressing, funded by Deborah Mitchell and Shirley Blair. The record has never been reprinted, and has become a collector's item. "S.S. Social Service" was included on All Your Ears Can Hear, a 2007 compilation of early Victoria punk bands. "Look, Here Come the Wormies" has never been officially reissued.

The single did not receive press attention during its original release. Retrospectively, Canadian rock journalists Barclay, Jack, and Schnieder wrote that the songs on the single "were a sonic representation of the iconoclastic stance the [Wright] brothers had adopted." Ray Carter said "SS Social Service" was influenced by Public Image Ltd, and specifically bassist Jah Wobble.

== Track listing ==
- Side 'This' – Mass Appeal
1. "S.S. Social Service" – 4:52
- Side 'That' – Nomeansno
1. "Look, Here Come the Wormies" – 4:19

== Personnel ==
Side 'This' – Mass Appeal

- Ray Carter – vocals, bass, songwriter
- Rob Wright – guitar
- John Wright – drums

Side 'That' – Nomeansno

- John Wright – vocals, drums, keyboards, percussion
- Rob Wright – vocals, bass, guitar

Production and artwork

- Ray Carter, Jim Willey, John Wright – artwork
