= Dbx (noise reduction) =

Family of noise-reduction systems

The logo represents both the company and its noise-reduction system

dbx is a family of noise-reduction systems developed by the company of the same name. The most common implementations are dbx Type I and dbx Type II for analog tape recording and, less commonly, vinyl LPs. A separate implementation, known as dbx-TV, is part of the MTS system used to provide stereo sound to North American and certain other TV systems. The company, dbx, Inc., was also involved with Dynamic Noise Reduction (DNR) systems.

== History ==
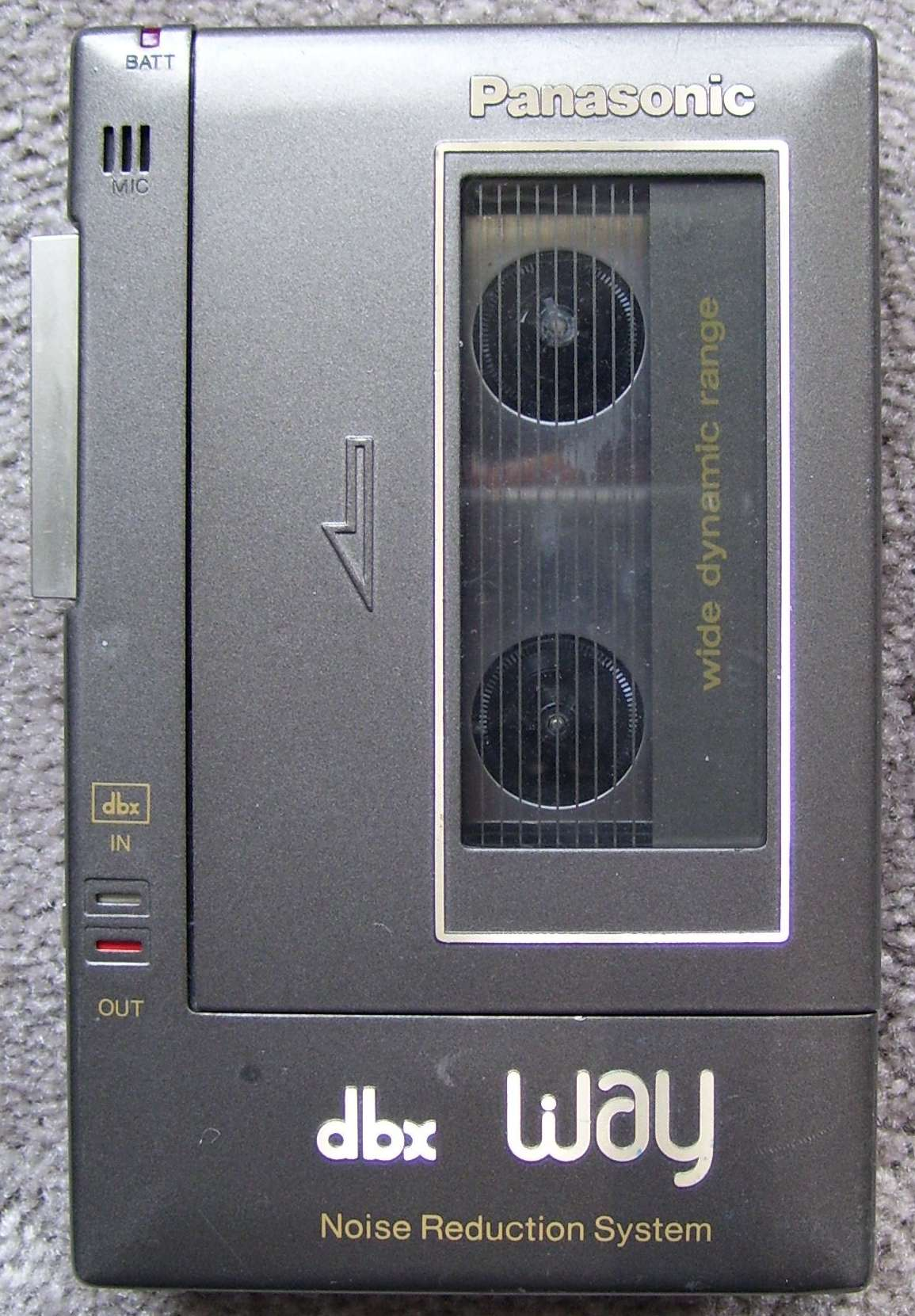
The Panasonic RQ-J20X portable cassette player from 1982 was the first device to implement the dbx integrated circuit

The original dbx Type I and Type II systems were based on so-called "linear decibel companding" - compressing the signal on recording and expanding it on playback. It was invented by David E. Blackmer of dbx, Inc. in 1971.

A miniature dbx Type II decoder on an integrated circuit was created in 1982 for use in portable and car audio, although only a few devices took advantage of it, such as certain Panasonic portable cassette players and Sanyo car stereos. dbx marketed the PPA-1 Silencer, a decoder that could be used with non-dbx players such as the Sony Walkman. A version of this chip also contained a Dolby B-compatible noise-reduction decoder, described as dbx Type B noise reduction; this was possible after the Dolby patent (but not the trademark) had expired.

Software implementations have been developed.

== How dbx works ==
=== Tape hiss ===
Magnetic tape consists of microscopic particles that can be magnetically charged to record signals. The size of the particles and the speed of the tape transport define the maximum frequency that the media can record. For high fidelity recordings, reel-to-reel audio tape recording typically works at tape speeds of 15 or 7.5 inches-per-second (38 or 19 cm/s), but this requires a lot of tape for a given amount of recording. Lower fidelity recordings can be made at 3.75 or even 1.875 ips, which allows more recording time on a given tape, but at the cost of adding more high-frequency noise.

The cassette tape was designed for convenience, not audio quality, and ran at 1.8755 ips (4.75 cm/s) to maximize recording time in the relatively small (compared to open-reel) tapes. This resulted in significant tape hiss. Combined with their limited width, which also limits the dynamic range of the signals, the hiss tended to overwhelm any high frequencies in the signal, especially low-volume ones.

During the 1970s, several new types of magnetic recording films were introduced, notably "chrome" and "metal", that used smaller particles and thereby pushed the tape hiss to much higher frequencies. During the same period, noise-reduction systems like dbx and Dolby attempted to do the same using conventional media and actively addressing the tape noise through electronics.

=== Companding ===
dbx companding compresses the original source (left) into a version with less dynamic range (middle), and then re-expands it (right). The tape hiss (pink) is also expanded by this process, but is overwhelmed by the now-expanded original signal.

dbx Type I and Type II are types of "companding noise reduction". These systems work by first compressing the dynamic range of the signal into a range that can be safely recorded on the tape. This type of compression, dynamic range compression, mutes down loud sounds and amplifies soft ones, making the volume of the recording much more even. On playback, the dynamic range is expanded by the same amount, causing the low-volume sounds to become low-volume again and vice versa. The combination of compression and re-expansion gives rise to the name companding. Companding is useful even outside the field of noise reduction; a cassette might have 40 decibels of dynamic range before the media saturates, while the original signal might use 70 for, say, a live recording of a concert. In this case, companding at 2-to-1 will result in a signal with 35 decibels of range, which can be recorded without clipping.

The reason this technique works for noise reduction is that the tape hiss manifests itself as a constant low-volume signal. When the signal is recorded in its original form, without compression, the amount of hiss may be the same volume as softer sounds, masking them entirely. However, when the signal is compressed before recording, those soft sounds are recorded at a louder volume, so now even the soft sounds are louder than the noise. This improves the signal-to-noise ratio.

When the signal is re-expanded, the tape hiss is expanded along with it, making it louder as well. However, the ratio of the signal to noise remains (close to) constant through this process, so the resulting output retains this higher signal-to-noise ratio. Ultimately, it means that while tape hiss does get louder during "soft" portions of the recording, the recording itself is (hopefully) always greater in volume and renders the hiss much less noticeable.

=== Pre-emphasis ===
Note that the tape hiss is limited to higher frequencies. That means a signal that is primarily low-frequency does not necessarily require noise reduction. Instead, one can simply roll off all the higher frequencies in a low-pass filter, and the hiss will largely disappear.

Consider a signal that contains a high-volume section and then low-volume. During recording, these signals are compressed to be much closer together in level, so that the high-volume section does not saturate the tape and the low-volume section is louder than the tape hiss. On playback, the louder section has little or no muting applied, so the tape hiss is also left alone at its natural volume. When the softer section plays, having been amplified during recording, the expander mutes it down its original level. This also mutes down the tape hiss.

This causes the volume of tape hiss to change during playback. This is not really noticeable when the original signal contains high frequencies that play over the hiss, but for lower frequencies, this can be easily heard. The rise and fall of the tape hiss was known as "breathing" because it sounded like something breathing into a microphone.

To address this, dbx uses strong high-frequency "pre-emphasis" of the original signal. This amplifies high-frequency sounds before they are sent into the compressor. This causes the compressor to 'back off' the gain in certain circumstances and reduce the audibility of noise modulation – even with this pre-emphasis, noise modulation can become audible when using very noisy media to begin with, such as the cassette format.

=== dbx I and II ===
dbx Type I system is meant to be used with professional recording media that have a signal-to-noise (S/N), before noise reduction, of at least 60 dB and a -3 dB frequency response of at least 30 Hz to 15 kHz. The system relies on the medium being fairly linear in volume and frequency response.

dbx Type-II is for more noisy media that have a lower S/N and much more restricted frequency response. In the control signal path, the dbx Type II process rolls off the high and low-frequency response to desensitize the system to frequency response errors – since the roll-off is only in the control path, it does not affect the audible sound. The dbx Type-II "disc" setting on consumer dbx decoders adds an additional 1–3 dB of low-frequency roll-off in both the audio path and control path. This protects the system from audible mistracking due to record warps and low-frequency rumble.

Both systems use 2:1 companding and provide exactly the same amount of noise reduction and dynamic range improvement – in other words, they provide the same end results, but are not compatible with each other.

=== dbx vs. Dolby ===
Both dbx and the Dolby noise-reduction system use companding to control noise. They differ in the way they address the frequency response of the companding process. dbx uses a single-frequency pre-emphasis system, whereas Dolby uses four separate pre-emphasis amplifiers, each for a different frequency band. Since tape hiss is primarily a problem for high-frequency sounds, Dolby uses much stronger pre-emphasis at high frequencies than low. This means that a low-volume, low-frequency signal may see little or no companding, whereas the same volume at high-frequencies will have been strongly pre-emphasized to a higher volume level before compression.

The use of separate pre-emphasizing "encoding curves" allows the overall compression to be much less than it would be on dbx, where it is always 2 to 1. For lower frequency signals, like a conversation, Dolby may apply no compression at all. In contrast, dbx would continue to compand these signals, in which case the tape hiss is also re-expanded on playback, continually varying as the volume changes.

== Lack of dbx acceptance in marketplace ==
Although it brought a wider dynamic range, and therefore diminished noise, to the cassette tape medium, dbx noise reduction did not achieve widespread popularity in the consumer marketplace, as compressed recordings did not sound acceptable when played back on non-dbx equipment. Dolby B was already widely used when dbx was introduced. Although Dolby noise reduction also used some companding, the level of compression and expansion was very mild, so that the sound of Dolby-encoded tapes was acceptable to consumers when played back on non-Dolby equipment.

- dbx Type I was widely adopted in professional recording, particularly used with what is referred to in the industry as "semi-pro" formats such as half-inch 8 track and one-inch 16 track.
- Tascam incorporated dbx Type II in their Portastudio four-track cassette recorders. Tascam's Portastudio family of 4 track cassette recorders became a standard for home hobbyists.
- An advantage of dbx Type I and Type II compared to Dolby noise reduction is that it did not require calibration with the output level of the tape deck, which could cause incorrect tracking with Dolby B and C, leading to muffled high tones.
- However, due to dbx's high compression and strong high-frequency preemphasis, dbx-encoded tapes were, unlike Dolby B, practically unplayable on non-dbx systems, sounding very harsh when played back undecoded. Undecoded dbx playback also exhibited large amounts of dynamic error, with audio levels going up and down constantly.

While dbx Type-II NR was eventually designed into a self-contained LSI chip, it was never cheap due to the extremely high precision required of the dbx VCAs and the RMS signal analysis, leading to further reluctance of manufacturers to use the dbx chips in their products.

== dbx with vinyl phonograph records ==
dbx was also used on vinyl records, which were labeled dbx disc. While the earliest release is from 1971/1973, their numbers peaked between 1977/1978 until around 1982. Billboard noted in August 1981 that the total number of releases with dbx encoding was expected to approach 200 albums. When employed on LPs, the dbx Type-II system reduced the audibility of dust and scratches, reducing them to tiny pops and clicks (if they were audible at all) and also completely eliminated record surface noise. dbx encoded LPs had, in theory, a dynamic range of up to 90 dB. In addition, dbx LPs were produced from only the original master tapes, with no copies being used, and pressed only on heavy, virgin vinyl. Most were released in limited quantities with premium pricing.

== dbx with pro reel tape recorders, as well as other professional/commercial audio production and reproduction ==
The dbx K9 noise-reduction card was designed to fit into the pro Dolby-A series A-361 frames, already in wide use in pro reel-to-reel recording studios of the time.

The full designation of the card is K9-22, which is a dog vs. cat joke. The K9-22 is pin and form-factor compatible with the Dolby card designated and colloquially known as Cat. 22 (K9 is pronounced "canine").

The dbx 192 was an elegant design made especially for the Nagra IV-Stereo recorder. It had a single push-button for record/playback encode/decode, and was integrated directly into the Nagra's internal signal path. It drew power from the Nagra supply.

== dbx for television ==
dbx-TV noise reduction, while having elements in common with Type I and Type II, is different in fundamental ways, and was developed by Mark Davis (then of dbx, now of Dolby Labs) in the early 1980s.

dbx-TV is included in multichannel television sound (MTS), the U.S. standard for stereo analog television transmission. Every TV device that decoded MTS originally required the payment of royalties, first to dbx, Inc., then to THAT Corporation which was spun off from dbx in 1989 and acquired its MTS patents in 1994; however, those patents expired worldwide in 2004.

== dbx in film production ==
dbx noise reduction, capable of more than 20 dB of noise reduction, was used in the re-recording of the film Apocalypse Now in 1979. Dolby A-type noise reduction, capable of only 10-12 dB of noise reduction, was used only at the final stage for the mastering of the film's soundtrack to 70mm prints.

A modified version of dbx was also used in the Colortek stereo film system. In addition, dbx Type-II noise reduction was used in the Model-II and Model-III variants of MCA's Sensurround Special Effects System on the optical audio track and was a cornerstone of the entire system. MCA's Sensurround+Plus, used on the film Zoot Suit, employed dbx Type-II with the 4-track magnetic sound format on 35mm film prints, providing the motion picture with a stereo soundtrack capable of wide dynamic range and freedom from noise.

== dbx for program delivery via the American NPR Public Radio Satellite System ==
The first generation Public Radio Satellite System (PRSS), introduced in 1979 and used by the American National Public Radio for delivery of network programming to their member stations via satellite, was a single channel per carrier (SCPC) system that had about 40 dB of analog (recovered) signal to noise. dbx modules that were set for 3:1 were used to increase the dynamic range of the system. Typically this worked well but for some low frequencies the distortion exceeded 10 percent THD. Also, the dbx modules varied in how they tracked the compressed audio so the expanded audio was not an exact representation of what was compressed at the uplink. Still, the use of dbx allowed NPR to be known for its high fidelity standards on its satellite system as commercial broadcasters chose NPR to up-link a number of commercial radio music programs and concerts by commercial radio networks who demanded high fidelity in the analog era. Many of these problems were resolved when the PRSS moved to its second-generation system in 1994, the Satellite Operations Support System (SOSS), in which the feeds were sent digitally.

== See also ==
- Dolby noise-reduction system
- CX noise-reduction system
- High Com noise-reduction system
- UC noise-reduction system
