= Bob Adams (engineer) =

American engineer

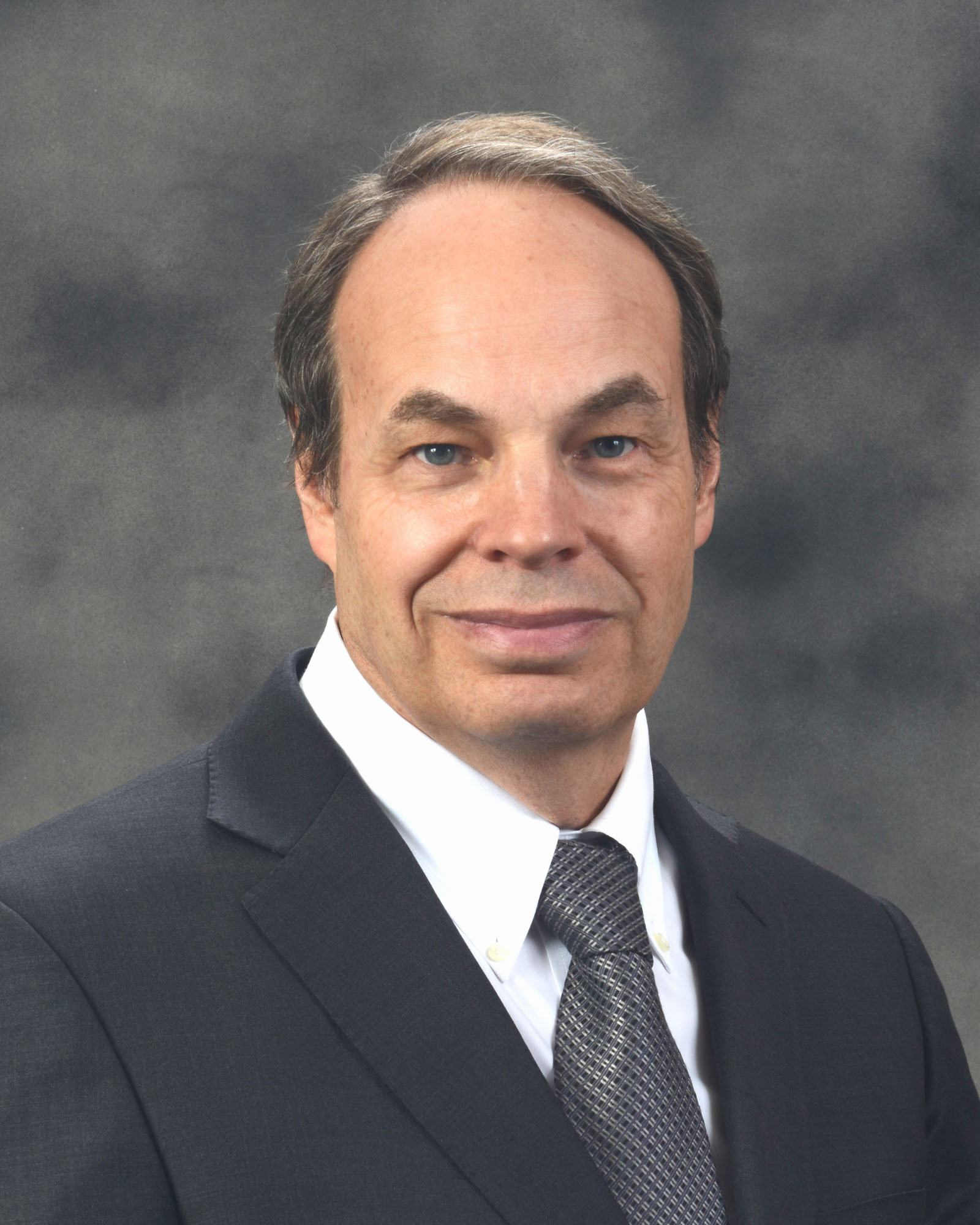
- Born: Robert Whitlock Adams
- Education: Tufts University (BS, 1976)
- Known for: Sigma-delta modulation, Monolithic asynchronous sample rate converters, SigmaDSP
- Title: Technical Fellow
- Awards: National Academy of Engineering (2018); IEEE Pederson Award (2015); AES Silver Medal (1995); Electronic Design Hall of Fame (2011)
- Scientific career
- Fields: Electrical engineering, Signal processing, Audio engineering
- Workplaces: Analog Devices dbx

Robert Whitlock Adams is a Technical Fellow at Analog Devices, Inc. (ADI) in Wilmington, Massachusetts. His focus is on signal processing and analog-to-digital conversion for professional audio. He is a leader in the development of sigma-delta converters, introducing architectural advances including mismatch shaping, multi-bit quantization, and continuous-time architectures.

Adams graduated with a Bachelor of Science in Electrical Engineering from Tufts University in 1976. From 1977 to 1988 he worked for DBX, a professional audio recording company. There, he helped develop the industry's first audio converter with greater than 16-bit resolution, as well as one of the earliest digital audio recorders. In 1988, he joined the Converter Group of Analog Devices as a Senior Staff Designer, and went on to develop ADI's first sigma-delta converters in partnership with Paul Ferguson. He produced the world's first monolithic asynchronous sample rate converters (the AD1890 family), and he created ADI's sigmaDSP line of audio-specific digital signal processing cores.

As of 1998, Adams had received 15 patents related to audio signal processing.

== Awards and honors ==
- Elected Fellow of the Audio Engineering Society (AES), 1991
- Received AES Silver Medal Award, 1995
- Included in Electronic Design magazine's Engineering Hall of Fame, 2011
- Became a Fellow of the Institute of Electrical and Electronics Engineers (IEEE), 2012 "for contributions to analog and digital signal processing"
- Received the IEEE Donald O. Pederson Award, 2015 "for contributions to noise-shaping data converter circuits, digital signal processing, and log-domain analog filters"
- Elected as a member into the National Academy of Engineering in 2018 for contributions to digital storage and reproduction of high-fidelity audio.
