= Dbx (company) =

American audio equipment manufacturer

dbx, Inc.
- Type: Pro Audio Manufacturer
- Industry: Audio
- Founded: 1971
- Headquarters: Sandy, Utah, United States
- Key people: David E. Blackmer, Founder
- Products: Noise reduction systems Signal processing equipment Compressors; EQs; Active crossovers Loudspeaker management systems
- Owner: Samsung Electronics
- Parent: Harman International
- Website: Dbxpro.com

dbx, Inc. is an American manufacturer of professional audio recording equipment owned by Harman International, a subsidiary of South Korea-based company Samsung Electronics. It was founded by David E. Blackmer in 1971.

The original company goal was: "To get closer to the realism of a live performance." Its early products were based on the concept of using decibel expansion which gave the company its name.

dbx is best known for the dbx noise reduction system, a decibel companding system used for noise reduction in professional analog tape recording that was in competition with Dolby NR in the early 1970s; though their systems did not gain as much traction. dbx is also the manufacturer of the Model 700, a unique but short-lived studio recording system, briefly popular in some circles as a mastering format. Another early product was the eXpanded range DeciBel meter, a little solid-state meter that measured audio voltages both weaker and stronger than other bigger contemporary volume meters, built into an aluminum extrusion that was about the size of the meter itself, which was an earlier source of the company initials. That dBx meter was related to their earlier CBS 600 extended range volume meter, developed and built at CBS Laboratories.

== Voltage controlled amplifier ==
The most important inventions of David Blackmer and dbx are the Blackmer gain cell (a voltage controlled amplifier for professional audio) and the dbx RMS detector. The original dbx 202 VCA was based on the Blackmer gain cell and was referred to as the dbx 202 "Black Can" VCA. They were built using discrete transistors that were hand matched while running at an elevated temperature in an oven. While noisy and having significant distortion, they exceeded by far the performance of other VCAs of the time. These VCAs were used in most early automated mixing boards.

== dbx compressors ==
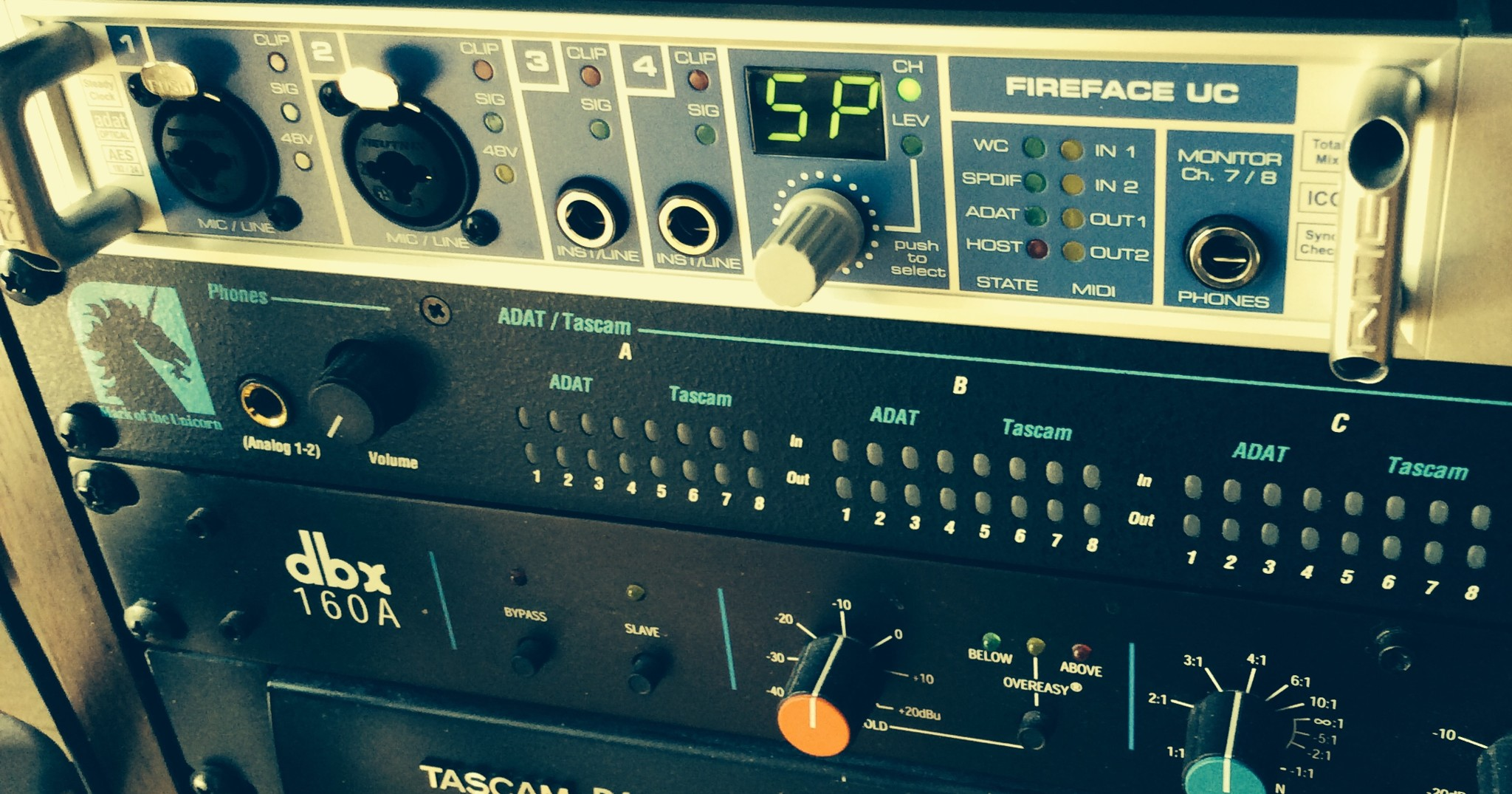
dbx 160A compressor/limiter, is a widely used dynamic range compressor.

In 1976 dbx introduced the dbx 160 compressor. Using dbx's decilinear VCA and RMS level-detection circuits and feed forward gain reduction this compressor allowed much smoother gain reduction. The feed forward gain reduction allowed infinite compression without excessive distortion or oscillation. It also allowed the compressor to track the attack and release times of compression based on the signal's envelope. The dbx 160 compressor also introduced OverEasy compression in which soft-knee gain reduction kicks in upon approaching a preset threshold.

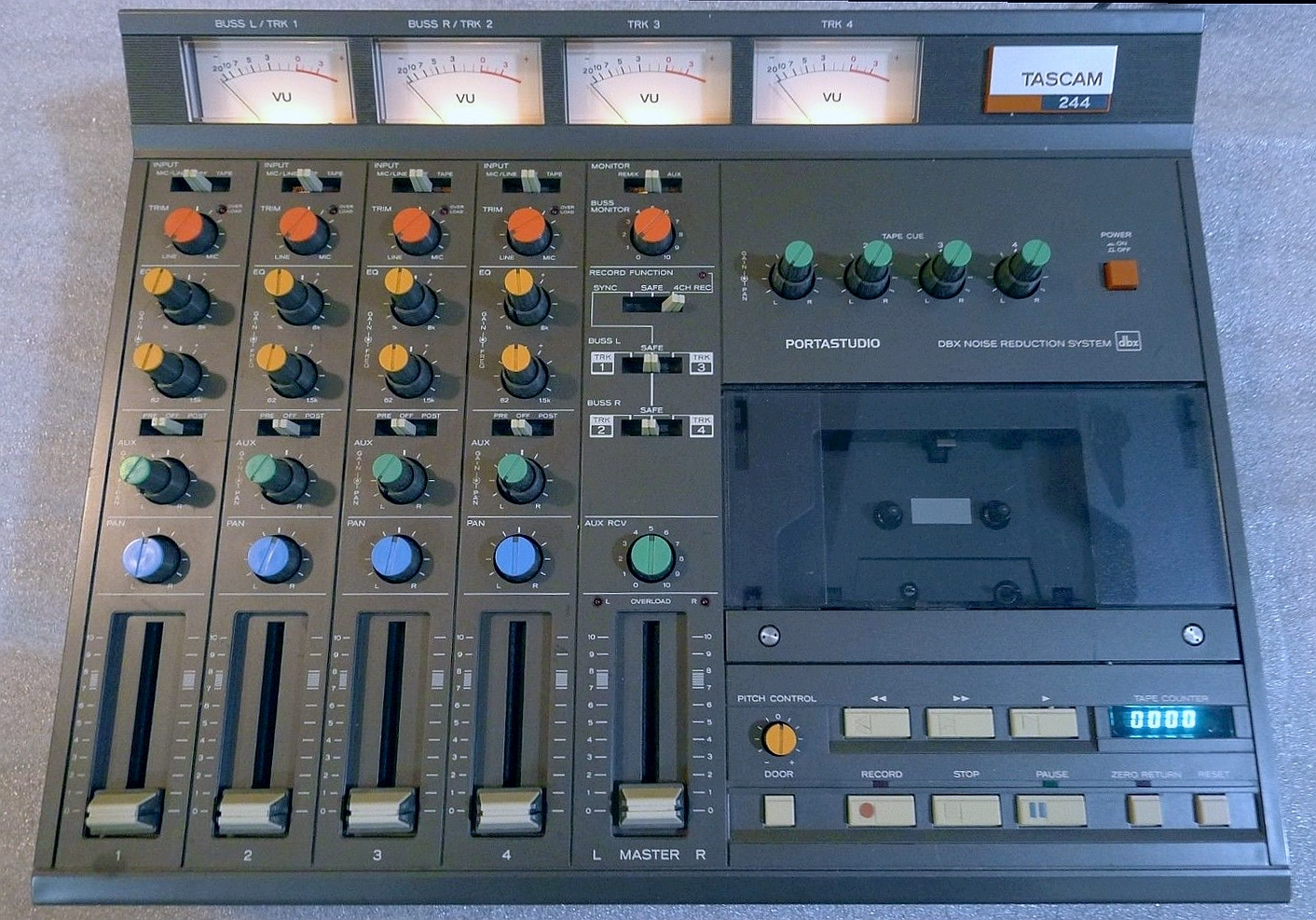
TASCAM Portastudio 244 with dbx noise reduction processor.

== dbx noise reduction ==
A pro noise reduction card was the dbx k9, designed to fit into the pro dolby-A A361 frames, which were already in wide use in pro studios of the time, to reduce noise in reel-to-reel tape recordings. One feature of the dbx system was an inbuilt noise-gate, to just shut off anything below a certain decibel level.

== Acquisition history of dbx ==
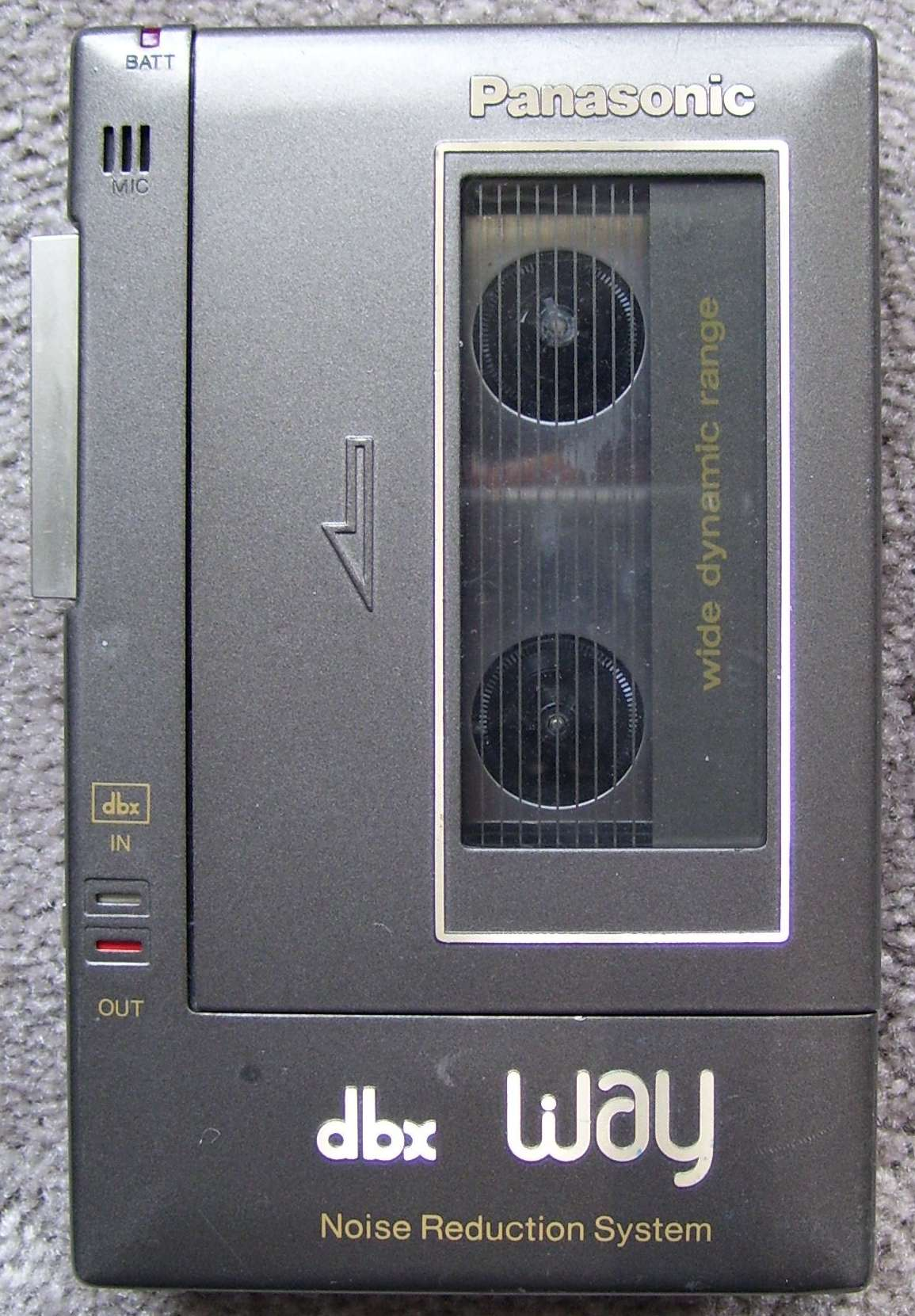
The Panasonic RQ-J20X portable cassette player contains an integrated circuit based on the dbx Type II noise reduction system, branded dbx Way. Panasonic was a major user of dbx consumer technology.

dbx manufactured only signal processing equipment until bought by BSR in 1979. From 1979 until 1989, the brand name was also used for consumer audio equipment such as speakers, CD players and amplifiers. In 1989, the short-lived Carillon Corporation bought dbx. Sanju Chiba of ELPJ acquired the dbx division of BSR and after virtually shutting down, the professional products division of dbx was sold off as a separate business to Orban AKG which in turn was bought by Harman International. The OEM business was sold to THAT Corporation founded by members of dbx's engineering group. dbx once held key patents for MTS, the U.S. standard for stereo analog television transmission, but in 1994 it sold those patents to THAT Corporation.

In the present, they sell professional digital signal processors, equalizers, compressors, crossovers, subharmonic synthesizers, and many similar products.
