= Portastudio =

Home recording studio equipment

Portastudio refers to a series of multitrack recorders produced by TASCAM beginning in 1979 with the introduction of the TEAC 144, the first four-track compact cassette-based recorder. Although a TASCAM trademark, "portastudio" is commonly used to refer to any self-contained multitrack recorder dedicated to music production.

The Portastudio is credited with launching the home recording revolution by making it possible for musicians to easily and affordably record and produce multitrack music at home and is cited as one of the most significant innovations in music production technology.

== History ==
=== Cassette Portastudios ===
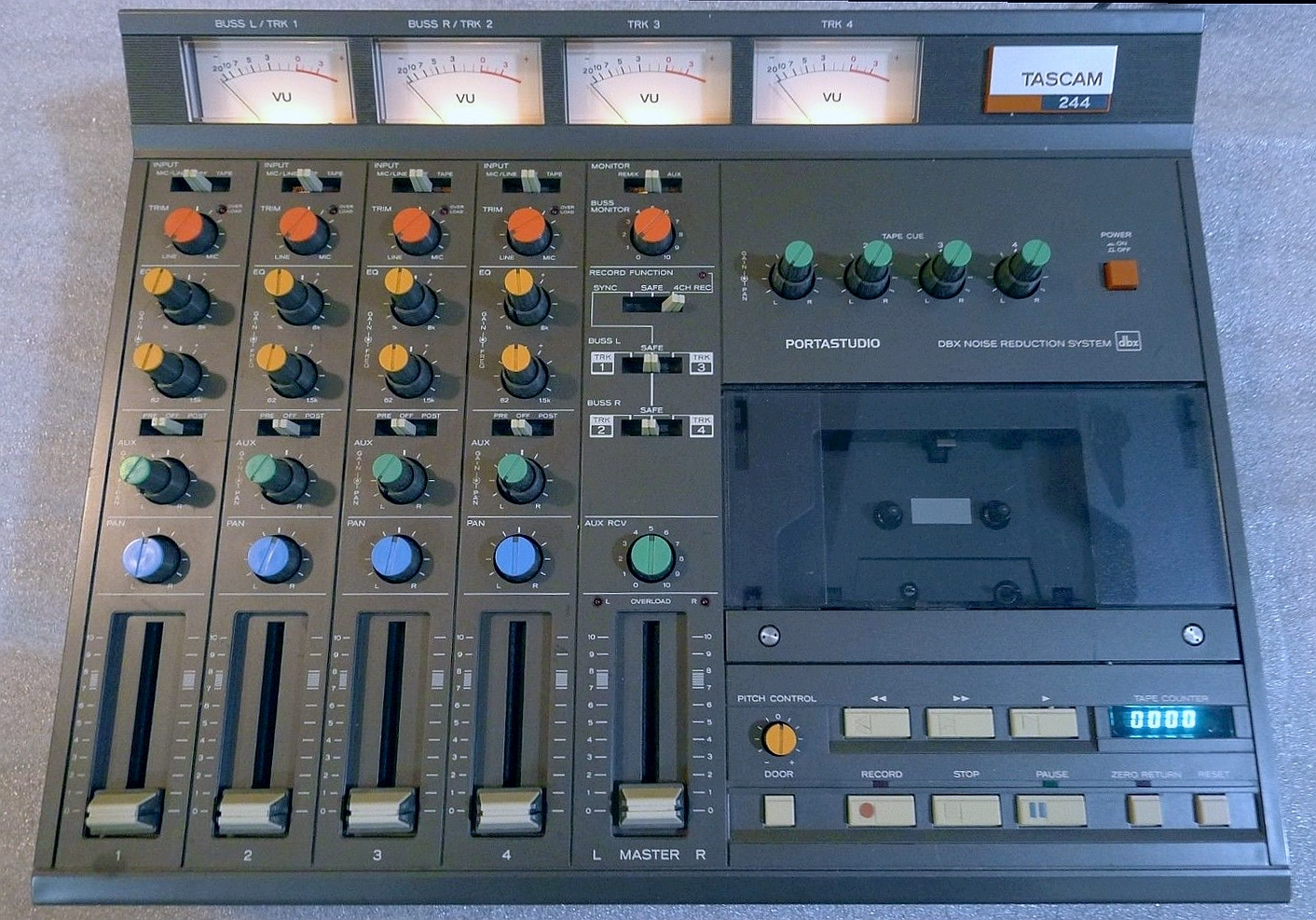
Tascam Portastudio 244, 1982

The first Portastudio, the TEAC 144, was introduced on September 22, 1979, at the AES Convention in New York City. The 144 combined a 4-channel mixer with pan, treble, and bass on each input with a cassette recorder capable of recording four tracks (with Dolby B noise reduction) in one direction at 3¾ inches per second (double the normal cassette playback speed) in a self-contained unit weighing less than 20 pounds at a list price of US$899. The 144 was the first product that made it possible for musicians to affordably record several instrumental and vocal parts on different tracks of the built-in 4-track cassette recorder individually and later blend all the parts together, while transferring them to another standard, two-channel stereo tape deck (remix and mixdown) to form a stereo recording. In 1981, Fostex introduced the first of their "Multitracker" line of multitrack cassette recorders with the 250.

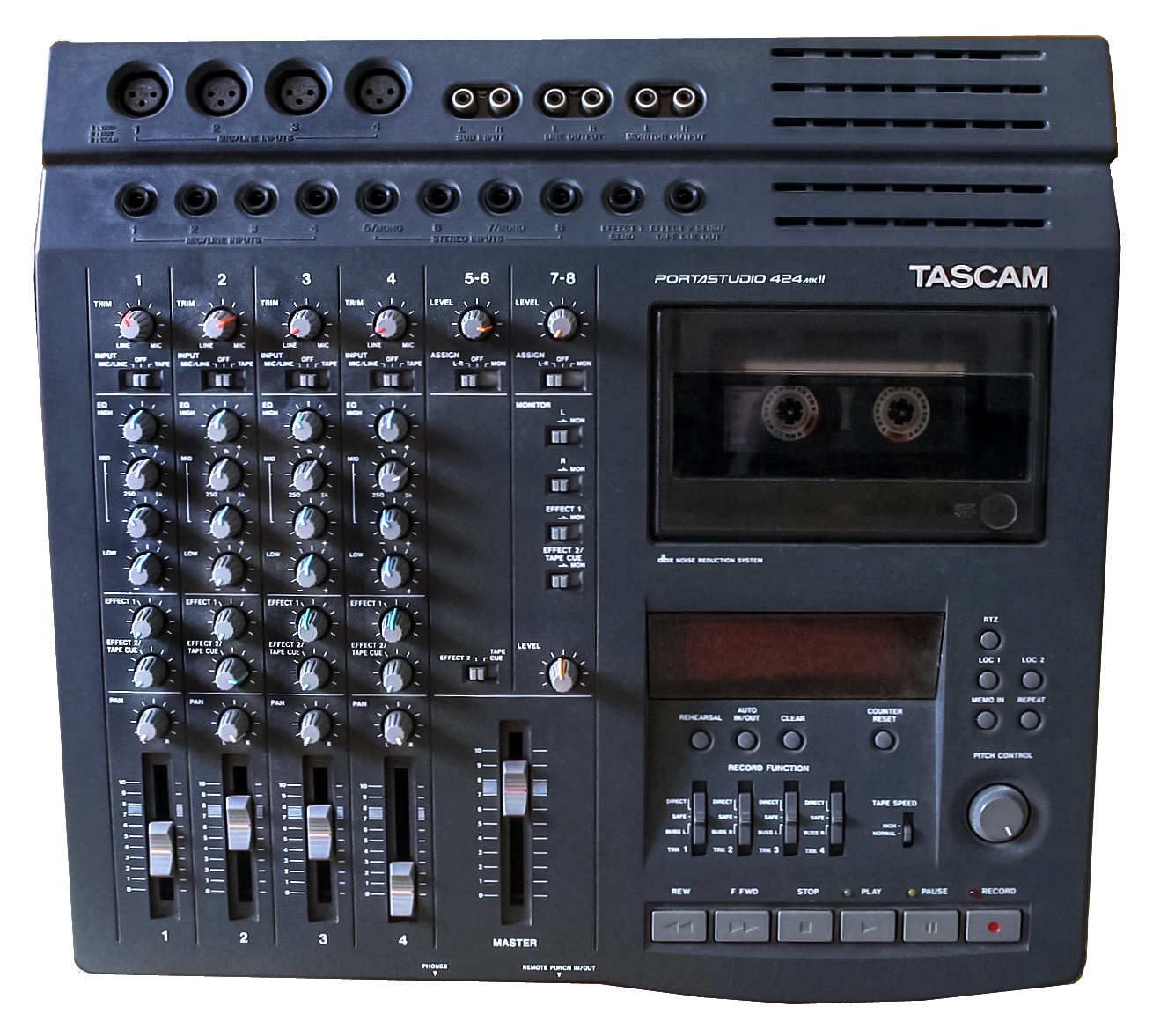
Portastudio 424 MkII, c. 1996

In 1982, TASCAM replaced the 144 with the 244 Portastudio, which improved upon the previous design with overall better sound quality and more features, including: parametric EQ, dbx Type II noise reduction, and the ability to record up to four tracks simultaneously.

TASCAM continued to develop and release cassette-based portastudio models with different features until 2001, including the "Ministudio" line of portastudios that offered a limited feature set and the ability to run on batteries at even more affordable price points, and the "MIDIStudio" line which added MIDI functionality. Other manufacturers, including Fostex, Yamaha, Akai, Audio-Technica, Sansui, Marantz, Vestafire, Clarion, Studiomaster and others introduced their own lines of multitrack cassette recorders. Most were four-track recorders, but there were also six-track (Sansui) and eight-track units (TASCAM and Yamaha).

Most cassette based portastudios used cassette tape designated as type II with some form of noise reduction, usually Dolby B, C or S or DBX type II. Several of the more refined better built units, if used with quality cassette tape and a skillful operator could produce recordings of unexpectedly high quality.

=== Digital Portastudios ===
In 1997, TASCAM introduced the first digital Portastudio: the TASCAM 564 which recorded to MiniDisc. Later Digital Portastudio models, some with the ability to record 24 or even 32 tracks, utilize CD-R, internal hard drives, or SD cards, and commonly include built-in DSP effects.

== Impact and legacy ==
The Portastudio, and particularly its first iteration, the TEAC 144, is credited with launching the home recording revolution by making it possible for musicians to easily and affordably record and produce multitrack music themselves wherever they wanted and is cited as one of the most significant innovations in music production technology. In general, these machines were typically used by amateur and professional musicians to record demos, although some Portastudio projects, most notably Bruce Springsteen's 1982 album Nebraska, have become notable major-label releases. Beginning in the 1990s, cassette-based Portastudios experienced new popularity for lo-fi recording.

In 2006, the TEAC Portastudio was inducted into the TECnology Hall of Fame, an honor given to "products and innovations that have had an enduring impact on the development of audio technology." In 2021, in conjunction with TASCAM's 50th anniversary, a software plug-in emulation of the Porta One ministudio was released by IK Multimedia. Many notable artists have used varying Portastudios to record their tracks and albums.

== See also ==
- Multitrack recording
- Bouncing Down (Audio Engineering)
