= Variable-gain amplifier =

Electronic amplifier that varies its gain depending on a control input

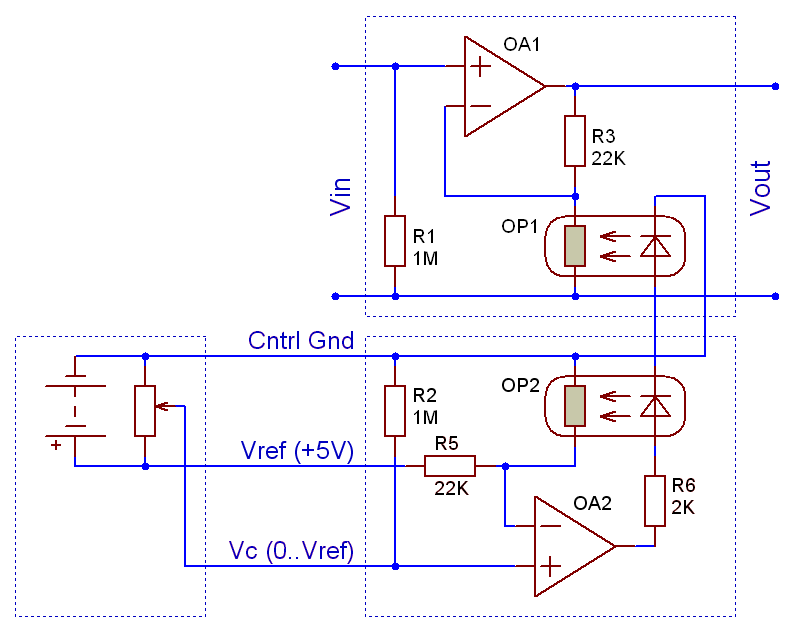
Schematic diagram of a vactrol-based inverse law voltage-controlled amplifier with split grounds

In the context of audio electronics, a variable-gain amplifier (VGA) is one and the same as a voltage-controlled amplifier (VCA). A VCA is an electronic amplifier that varies its gain depending on a control voltage (often abbreviated CV).

In other contexts, a variable-gain amplifier isn't necessarily controlled by an electrical signal - for example, a potentiometer can control gain from +1 (unity gain) to -1 (inverting unity gain).

VCAs have many applications, including audio level compression, synthesizers and amplitude modulation.

A voltage-controlled amplifier can be realized by first creating a voltage-controlled resistor (VCR), which is used to set the amplifier gain. A simple example is a typical inverting op-amp configuration with a light-dependent resistor (LDR) in the feedback loop. The gain of the amplifier then depends on the light falling on the LDR, which can be provided by an LED (an optocoupler). The gain of the amplifier is then controllable by the current through the LED. This is similar to the circuits used in optical audio compressors. Another type of circuit uses operational transconductance amplifiers.

In audio applications, logarithmic gain control is used to emulate how the ear hears loudness. David E. Blackmer's dbx 202 VCA, based on the Blackmer gain cell, was among the first successful implementations of a logarithmic VCA.

Analog multipliers are a type of VCA designed to have accurate linear characteristics; the two inputs are identical and often work with both positive and negative voltage inputs.

== In sound mixing consoles ==
Some mixing consoles come equipped with VCAs in each channel for console automation. The fader, which traditionally controls the audio signal directly, becomes a DC control voltage for the VCA. The maximum voltage available to a fader can be controlled by one or more master faders called VCA groups. A VCA master fader then controls the overall level of all of the channels assigned to the group. Typically VCA groups are used to control various sections of the mix; vocals, guitars, drums or percussion. The VCA master fader allows that portion of a mix to be raised or lowered without affecting the blend of the instruments in that part of the mix.

A benefit of the VCA sub-group is that since it directly affects the gain level of each channel, changes to a VCA sub-group level affect not only the channel level but also all of the levels sent to any post-fader mixes. With traditional audio sub-groups, the sub-group master fader only affects the level going into the main mix. Consider the case of an instrument feeding a sub-group and a post-fader mix. If you completely lower the sub-group master fader, you would no longer hear the instrument itself, but you would still hear it as part of the post-fader mix, perhaps to a reverb or chorus effect.

VCA mixers are known to last longer than non-VCA analog mixers. Because the VCA controls the audio level instead of the physical fader, wear in the fader mechanism over time does not cause a degradation in audio quality.

VCAs were invented by David E. Blackmer, the founder of dbx, who used them to make dynamic range compressors. The first console using VCAs was the Allison Research computer-automated recording system designed by Paul C. Buff in 1973. Another early VCA capability on a sound mixer was the series of MCI JH500 studio recording desks introduced in 1975. The first VCA mixer for live sound was the PM3000 introduced by Yamaha in 1985.

== Digital variable-gain amplifier ==
A digitally controlled amplifier (DCA) is a variable-gain amplifier that is digitally controlled. The digitally controlled amplifier uses a stepped approach, giving the circuit graduated increments of gain selection. This can be done in several fashions, but certain elements remain in any design.

At its most basic form, a toggle switch strapped across the feedback resistor can provide two discrete gain settings. With eight switches and eight resistors in the feedback loop, each switch can enable a particular resistor to control the amplifier's feedback. To minimize the number of switches and resistors, combinations of resistance values can be utilized by activating multiple switches. If each switch were converted to a relay, a microcontroller could be used to activate the relays to attain the desired amount of gain.

Relays can be replaced with field-effect transistors of an appropriate type to reduce the mechanical nature of the design. Other devices, such as the CD4053 bi-directional CMOS analog multiplexer integrated circuit and digital potentiometers (combined resistor string and multiplexers) can serve well as the switching function.

== See also ==
- Automixer
- Mix automation
