= Log amplifier =

Electrical circuit

A log amplifier, which may spell log as logarithmic or logarithm and which may abbreviate amplifier as amp or be termed as a converter, is an electronic amplifier that for some range of input voltage $V_\text{in}$ has an output voltage $V_\text{out}$ approximately proportional to the logarithm of the input:

$$V_\text{out} \approx K \cdot \ln \left(\frac{V_\text{in}}{V_\text{ref}}\right) \, ,$$

where $V_\text{ref}$ is a normalization constant in volts, $K$ is a scale factor, and $\ln$ is the natural logarithm. Some log amps may mirror negative input with positive input (even though the mathematical log function is only defined for positive numbers), and some may use electric current as input instead of voltage.

Log amplifier circuits designed with operational amplifiers (opamps) use the exponential current–voltage relationship of a p–n junction (either from a diode or bipolar junction transistor) as negative feedback to compute the logarithm. Multistage log amplifiers instead cascade multiple simple amplifiers to approximate the logarithm's curve. Temperature-compensated log amplifiers may include more than one opamp and use closely-matched circuit elements to cancel out temperature dependencies. Integrated circuit (IC) log amplifiers have better bandwidth and noise performance and require fewer components and printed circuit board area than circuits built from discrete components.

Log amplifier applications include:

- Performing mathematical operations like multiplication (sometimes called mixing), division, and exponentiation. This ability is analogous to the operation of a slide rule and is used for:
  - Analog computers
  - Audio synthesis
  - Measurement instruments (e.g. power = current × voltage)
- Decibel (dB) calculation
- True RMS conversion
- Extending the dynamic range of other circuits, used for:
  - Automatic gain control of transmit power in radio frequency circuits
  - Scaling a large dynamic range sensor (e.g. from a photodiode) into a linear voltage scale for an analog-to-digital converter with limited resolution

A log amplifier's elements can be rearranged to produce exponential output, the logarithm's inverse function. Such an amplifier may be called an exponentiator, an antilogarithm amplifier, or abbreviated like antilog amp. An exponentiator may be needed at the end of a series of analog computation stages done in a logarithmic scale in order to return the voltage scale back to a linear output scale. Additionally, signals that were companded by a log amplifier may later be expanded by an exponentiator to return to their original scale.

== Basic opamp diode circuit ==
Basic opamp diode log amplifier

The basic opamp diode log amplifier shown in the diagram utilizes the diode's exponential current-voltage relationship for the opamp's negative feedback path, with the diode's anode virtually grounded and its cathode connected to the opamp's output $V_\text{out}$, used as the circuit output. The Shockley diode equation gives the current–voltage relationship for the ideal semiconductor diode in the diagram to be:

$$I_\text{D} = I_\text{S} \left(e^{\frac{-V_\text{out}}{V_\text{T}}} - 1\right),$$

where $I_\text{D}$ flows from the diode's anode to its cathode, $I_\text{S}$ is the diode's reverse saturation current and $V_\text{T}$ is the thermal voltage (approximately 26 mV at room temperature). When $-V_\text{out} \gg V_\text{T},$ the diode's current is approximately proportional to an exponential function:

$$I_\text{D} \simeq I_\text{S} e^{\frac{-V_\text{out}}{V_\text{T}}}.$$

Rearranging this equation gives the output voltage $V_\text{out}$ to be approximately:

$$V_{\text{out}} = -V_\text{T} \ln \left(\frac{I_\text{D}}{I_\text{S}} \right) \, .$$

An input voltage can easily be scaled and converted into the diode's current $I_\text{D}$ using Ohm's law by sending the input voltage through a resistance $R$ to the virtual ground, so the output voltage $V_\text{out}$ will be approximately:

$$V_{\text{out}} = -V_\text{T} \ln \left(\frac{V_\text{in}}{I_\text{S} \, R} \right) \, .$$

A necessary condition for successful operation of this log amplifier is that $V_\text{in}$ is always positive. This may be ensured by using a rectifier and filter to condition the input signal before applying it to the log amplifier's input. $V_\text{out}$ will then be negative (since the op amp is in the inverting configuration) and is negative enough to forward bias the diode.

=== Drawbacks ===
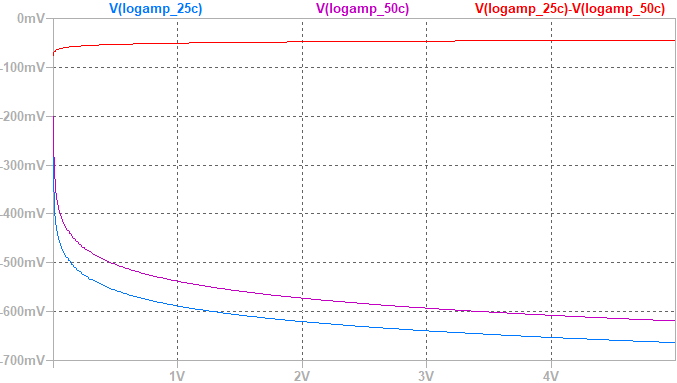
Log amp simulated with 1kΩ resistor and 1N4148 diode at 25°C (blue) and 50°C (purple). The difference (red) varies around 50mV.

The diode's saturation current $I_\text{S}$ doubles for every ten kelvin rise in temperature and varies significantly due to process variation. And because thermal voltage $V_\text{T}{=}\tfrac{kT}{q}$, the output voltage is also proportional to its kelvin temperature. Hence, it is very difficult to set the reference voltage for the circuit.

Additionally, the bulk resistance $R_{\text{B}}$ of a real diode limits accuracy at high currents due to an added $I_{\text{D}} R_{\text{B}}$ voltage term. And, diffusion currents in surface inversion layers and generation-recombination effects in space-charge regions cause a scale factor $m$ at low currents that varies (between 1 and 4) with current. With inputs near 0 volts, log amps have a linear $V_\text{in}$ to $V_\text{out}$ law. But this non-logarithmic behavior itself is often lost in this device noise, which limits the dynamic range to 40-60 dB, but the dynamic range can be increased to over 120 dB by replacing the diode with a transistor in a "transdiode" configuration.

To address inaccuracies for small inputs the size of $V_\text{T}$ or smaller and the question of how to handle negative inputs, one solution uses a symmetric function such as the inverse hyperbolic sine, whose graph approximates $\ln(2x)$ for large positive and negative $\ln(\text{-}2x)$ for large negative inputs, but which linearly goes through 0 for small inputs. This function may be implemented with a combination of N and P diodes (sold many years ago in a temperature compensated module) to make what is called a "true log" amp or "baseband log" amp (which may instead use a multistage amplifier architecture, as described in § True log amp).

== Transdiode configuration ==
A transdiode configuration with a BJT connected in the negative feedback loop.

While the floating diode in the earlier basic opamp implementation causes the output voltage to depend on the opamp's input offset current, the grounded-base or "transdiode" configuration shown in the diagram does not possess this problem. Negative feedback causes the opamp to output enough voltage on the base-emitter junction of the bipolar junction transistor (BJT) to ensure that all available input current is drawn through the collector of the BJT, so the output voltage is then referenced relative to the true ground of the transistor's base rather than the virtual ground. While the circuit in the diagram uses an npn transistor and produces a negative $V_\text{out}$ and sinks input current, a pnp will instead result in positive $V_\text{out}$ and a current-sourcing input.

With a positive $V_\text{in}$ large enough to make $V_\text{out}$ negative enough to forward bias the emitter-base junction of the BJT (to keep it in the active mode of operation), then:

$$\begin{align}
V_\text{BE} &= -V_\text{out} \\
I_\text{C} &=  I_\text{S}\left(e^\frac{V_\text{BE}}{V_\text{T}} - 1\right) \approx I_\text{S} e^\frac{V_\text{BE}}{V_\text{T}} \\
\Rightarrow V_\text{BE} &=  V_\text{T} \ln\left(\frac{I_\text{C}}{I_\text{S}}\right)
\end{align}$$

where $I_\text{S}$ is the saturation current of the emitter-base diode and $V_\text{T}$ is the thermal voltage. Due to the virtual ground at the opamp's inverting input,

$I_\text{C} = \frac{V_\text{in}}{R}$, and
$$V_\text{out} = -V_\text{T} \ln \left(\frac{V_\text{in}}{I_\text{S} R}\right)$$

The output voltage is expressed as the natural log of the input voltage. Both the saturation current $I_\text{S}$ and the thermal voltage $V_\text{T}$ are temperature dependent, hence, temperature compensation may be required.

=== Temperature compensation ===
Because temperature compensation is generally needed, it is often built into log amplifier ICs. Some analog computation chips that follow log operations by an antilog may conveniently compensate the log circuit's temperature variation by a similar variation in the antilog circuit.

One method to remove $I_\text{S}\,$temperature dependence is to copy the basic uncompensated BJT-based log amplifier, but use a constant current source instead of resistor $R$ for this copy, and then follow both log amplifiers by a difference amplifier. The BJTs should be matched and in thermal equilibrium, so that the difference amplifier subtracts the second BJT's junction voltage to cancel out $I_\text{S}\,$in the difference amplifier's output. The constant current source can also be used to set the desired x-axis intercept and allows users to make ratiometric measurements that are relative to a desired reference. Using a resistive temperature detector (e.g. a thermistor) in the difference amplifier's gain-setting resistors can minimize the remaining $V_\text{T}\,$dependence. Such architectures can be very accurate; for instance, the LOG200 chip released in 2024 achieves 160 dB dynamic range with under 0.2% log conformity error.

Texas Instruments application note AN-311 describes another temperature-compensated circuit which only uses two opamps instead of three and maintains 1% log conformity. It also uses a matched BJT configured with the second opamp to compensate for the first BJT's $V_\text{BE}$ temperature dependence by cancelling $I_\text{S}$ out from $\Delta V_\text{BE}$, the difference between the first BJT's $V_\text{BE}$ minus the second BJT's $V_\text{BE}$. The second BJT's collector is fed a constant current from a temperature-compensated Zener diode voltage reference and its emitter is tied to the emitter of the first BJT, which also connects through a resistor the output of the second opamp. The second BJT's $V_\text{BE}$ is fixed by its constant collector current. The second BJT's base voltage relative to ground is $\Delta V_\text{BE}$, so it will lack any $I_\text{S}$ component. This $\Delta V_\text{BE}$ is outputted through the midpoint of a temperature-compensated voltage divider (where one resistor has a much higher temperature coefficient) to counteract $V_\text{T}$'s temperature dependence. This circuit can also be inverted to form an exponentiator.

=== Drawbacks ===
BJT log converters still may have poor temperature rejection and poor log conformance over wide current variations. And because the bandwidth of a BJT depends on current, the bandwidth of log-antilog converters varies with signal amplitude and drops to near zero as the signal amplitude drops. Log converters have been claimed to be inferior to using modern high-resolution delta-sigma modulation analog-to-digital converters and performing calculations digitally.

== Multistage log amp architectures ==
While the previous circuits utilized the p–n junction's exponential current–voltage relationship for computing the log function, the following approaches instead approximate the log function by cascading multiple simpler amplifiers.

=== Basic multistage log amp ===
A basic multistage log amp works by cascading a series of N linear amplifiers, each with gain of A dB, and then summing the result. For small signals such that the final amplifier doesn't saturate, the total gain will be N·A dB. However, as the input signal level increases, the final amplifier will limit and thus make a fixed contribution to the sum, so that the gain will drop to (N-1)·A dB. As the signal increases, the second to last amplifier will limit, and so on, until the first limits. The resulting curve is a piecewise linear function approximation of the log function.

=== True log amp ===
If limiting amplifiers that clip "softly" are cascaded without summing, the approximation (which can be within 0.1 dB) is sometimes called a "true log amp". The response of both this true log amp and the basic multistage log amp are not truly logarithmic, because they are symmetric about zero (while the mathematical logarithm function is indeterminate for negative inputs) and are linear for small inputs. But, such a symmetrical transfer function is fine for capacitively coupled AC inputs, such as from radar receivers. The term "logarithmic converter" may better describe such functionality than "logarithmic amplifier".

=== Successive detection log amp ===
The successive detection log amp architecture is a variant of this which uses full or half wave detectors from the output of each amplifier stage, all connected to the log amplifier's output node.

== See also ==
- Diode
- Operational amplifier applications § Logarithmic output
