= Precision rectifier =

Electrical circuit

The precision rectifier, sometimes called a super diode, is an operational amplifier (opamp) circuit configuration that behaves like an ideal diode and rectifier.

The op-amp-based precision rectifier should not be confused with the power MOSFET-based active rectification ideal diode.

== Basic circuit ==
A simple precision rectifier circuit

The basic circuit implementing such a feature is shown on the right, where $R_\text{L}$ can be any load. When the input voltage is negative, the opamp puts its most negative voltage on the diode's anode, so the diode is reverse biased and works like an open circuit. Since almost no current will flow through the diode, the output voltage $V_\text{out}$ will be pulled down to ground through $R_\text{L}$. When the input becomes positive, it is amplified by the opamp, which switches the diode on. Because of the negative feedback, just enough current will flow through $R_\text{L}$ so that $V_\text{out}$ equals the input voltage.

The actual threshold is very close to zero, but is not zero. It equals the actual threshold of the diode, divided by the gain of the opamp.

This basic configuration has a problem, so it is not commonly used. When the input becomes (even slightly) negative, the opamp runs open-loop, as there is no feedback signal through the diode. For a typical opamp with high open-loop gain, the output saturates. If the input then becomes positive again, the op-amp has to get out of the saturated state before positive amplification can take place again. This change generates some ringing and takes some time, greatly reducing the frequency response of the circuit.

== Improved circuit ==
An improved precision rectifier circuit.

An alternative version is given on the right. In this case, when the input is greater than zero, D1 is off, and D2 is on, so the output is zero because the other end of $R_2$ is connected to the virtual ground and there is no current through $R_2$. When the input is less than zero, D1 is on and D2 is off, so the output is like the input with an amplification of $-R_2 / R_1$. Its input–output relationship is the following:

Super diode improved

This circuit has the benefit that the op-amp never goes into saturation, but its output must change by two diode voltage drops (about 1.2 V) each time the input signal crosses zero. Hence, the slew rate of the opamp and its frequency response (gain–bandwidth product) will limit high-frequency performance, especially for low signal levels, although an error of less than 1% at 100 kHz is possible.

Similar circuitry can be used to create a precision full-wave rectifier circuit.

== Peak detector ==
With a little modification, the basic precision rectifier can be used for detecting signal level peaks. In the following circuit, a capacitor retains the peak voltage level of the signal, and a switch is used for resetting the detected level. When the input V_{in} exceeds V_{c} (voltage across capacitor), the diode is forward-biased and the circuit becomes a voltage follower. Consequently, the output voltage V_{o} follows V_{in} as long as V_{in} exceeds V_{c}. When V_{in} drops below V_{c}, the diode becomes reverse-biased and the capacitor holds the charge until V_{in} again attains a value greater than V_{c}.

Peak detector
