= TASCAM =

American audio equipment manufacturer

- Type: Division
- Industry: Electronics
- Founded: 1971
- Headquarters: Tokyo, Japan
- Area served: Worldwide
- Parent: TEAC Corporation
- Website: Official website

TASCAM is the professional audio division of TEAC Corporation, headquartered in Tokyo, Japan. TASCAM established the Home Recording phenomenon by creating the "Project Studio" and is credited as the inventor of the Portastudio, the first cassette-based multi-track home studio recorders. TASCAM also introduced the first low-cost mass-produced multitrack recorders with Simul-Sync designed for recording musicians, and manufactured reel-to-reel tape machines and audio mixers for home recordists from the early 1970s through the mid-1990s. Since the early 00's, TASCAM has been an early innovator in the field-recording and audio accompaniment to video with their DR-series recording platforms. TASCAM celebrated its 50th anniversary in 2021.

TASCAM tape Portastudios were cited by Reverb.com as one of the top used gear pieces to increase in value in 2020, with original units jumping 30-65% over their price two years prior.

== History ==
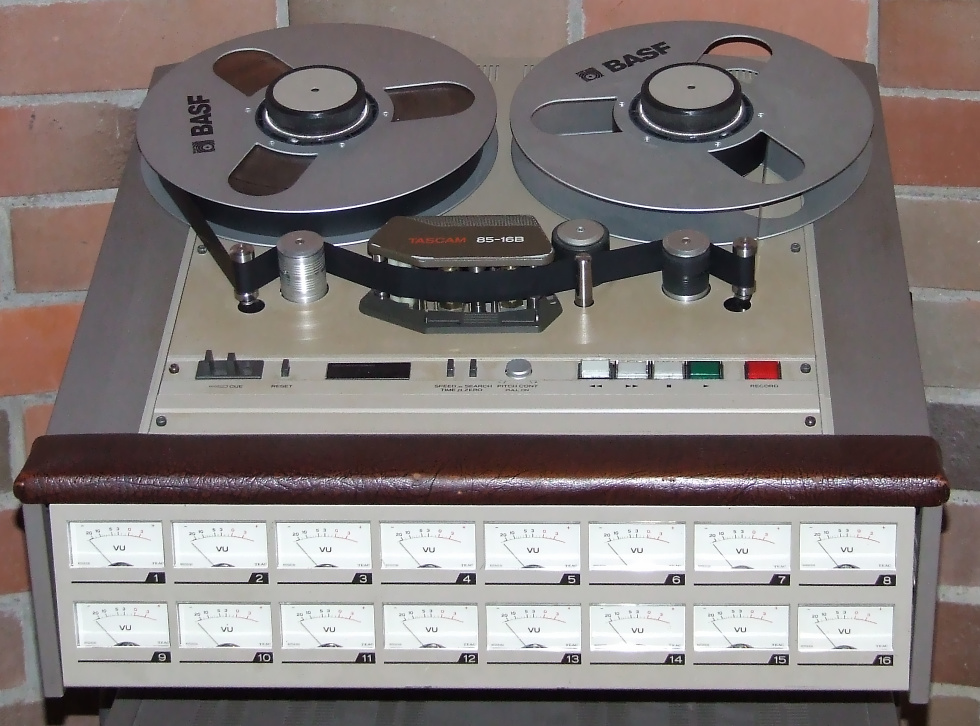
The TASCAM 85 16B analog tape recorder can record 16 tracks of audio on 1-inch (2.54cm) tape.

TASCAM started out as a research and development group to research how to use TEAC's recording technology in musician and recording studio products. The group was called TASC (TEAC Audio Systems Corp). The founders included Mr. K. Tani, one of the founders of TEAC-Japan and Dr. Abe, a senior TEAC-Japan engineer. In 1971 TASCAM (TASC AMerica Corp.) was founded to distribute TASC products in the U.S. It also conducted additional market research in the US for the Japanese parent company. The company's first headquarters was at 5440 McConnell Avenue in Los Angeles. In 1974 the company moved its headquarters to 7733 Telegraph Road, Montebello, California.

In 1973, the company introduced the first TASCAM-branded products:

- M-10 modular 12x4x2 mixer
- Series 70H-X MTR
- Series 70H-8 MTR

On March 4, 1973, TEAC merged the Tascam Corporation into TEAC Corporation of America (TCA). TEAC-Japan retains the exclusive worldwide rights to the TASCAM brand name for its professional audio related products.

In 2013, Gibson Brands Inc. bought a majority stake in TEAC Corporation, the parent company of TASCAM. In October 2017, TASCAM partnered with Philly punk band the Dead Milkmen and philanthropic record label The Giving Groove to sponsor a remix contest. TASCAM stakes were later returned by Gibson during their internal restructuring in 2018.

TASCAM released the new Model series in the Fall of 2018 with the Model 24 integrated 24-track production studio for mixing, recording, and use as a DAW controller. TASCAM followed up with the Model 16, a lower-priced 16-track mixing/recording studio in 2019, and released the Model 12, which introduced MIDI controller capabilities, hardware improvements, and stereo Bluetooth inputs and routing.

== Notable and industry-recognized products ==
=== Portastudio and pocketstudio ===
- 144 - 1979, World's first four-track recorder based on a standard cassette tape - 2006 Mix magazine TECnology hall of fame

Tascam Portaone Ministudio

- 244 Portastudio
- 246 Portastudio
- 234 Syncaset
- 238 Syncaset
- Porta One Ministudio - 1984, A battery-operated portable studio.
- Porta Two Ministudio - 1987
- Porta 02
- Porta 02 mkii
- Porta 03 - 1991
- Porta 03 mkii
- Porta 05
- Porta 07 - 1993
- 464 - 1992
- 424
- 424 mkii - 1996
- 424 mkiii
- 414 - 1997
- 414 mkii
- 488 - 1991, 8 track cassette recorder
- 488 mkii - 1995, 8 track cassette recorder
- 388 Studio - 1985 World's first eight-track 1/4" multitrack and mixer combination.
- 564 - 1997 First MiniDisc-based digital Portastudio.
- 788 - 2000 World's first 24-bit eight-track hard-disk Portastudio
- 2488 24-Track Hard-Drive-based digital portastudio - 2004 Music Trades Magazine Product of the Year, MIPA Desktop Recording Workstation of the Year
- DP-02 eight-track digital recorder - 2008 Music & Sound Retailer Best New Multitrack recorder
- DP-3 eight-track digital recorder captures music to SD/SDHC cards.
- DP-006 six-track digital battery-powered recorder captures music to SD/SDHC cards.
- DP-008EX eight-track digital battery-powered recorder captures music to SD/SDHC cards.
- DP-24SD 24-Track Digital Portastudio.
- DP-32SD 32-track Digital Portastudio

=== Audio recorders ===
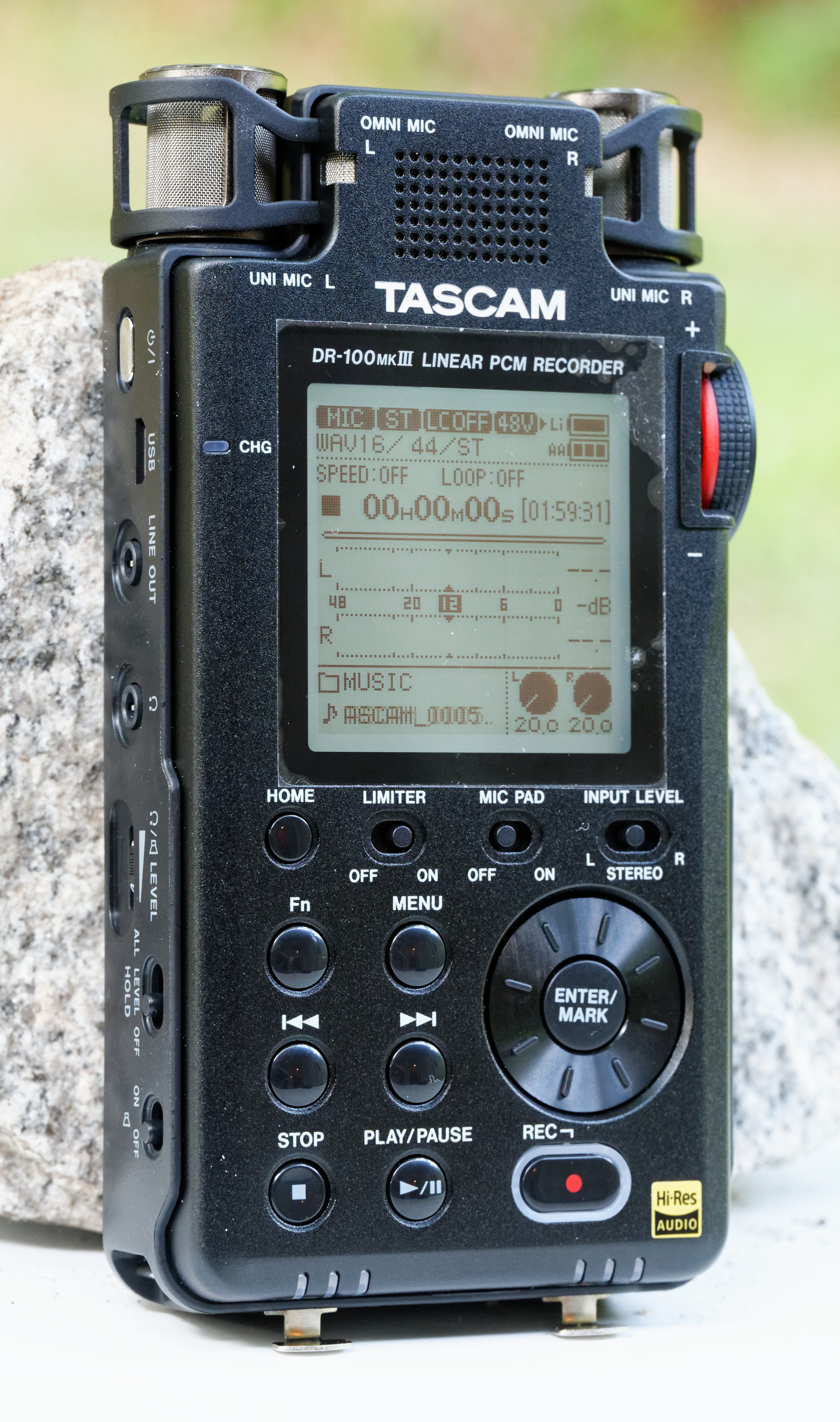
DR-100 mkIII

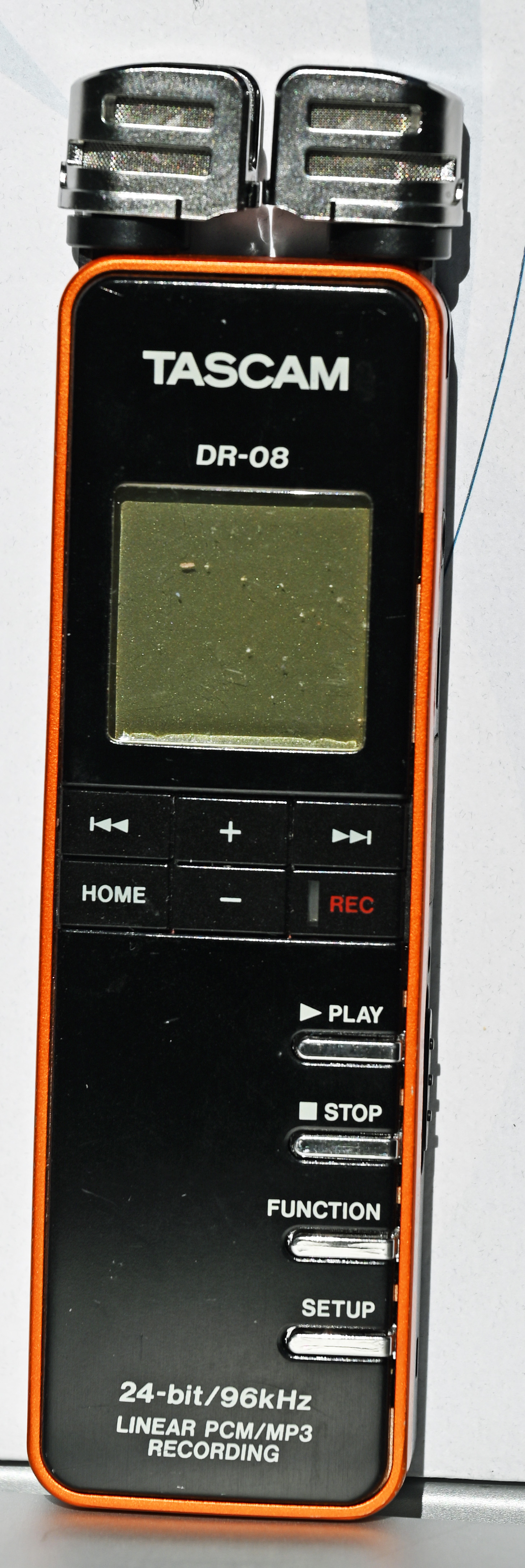
DR-08

- TASCAM 80-8 Eight-channel 1/2" analog reel deck, TASCAM offered an external optional eight-channel dedicated DBX interface module. 1975. 2017 TECnology Hall of Fame Inductee
- 90-16 - 1978, first 1" format 16 track open reel machine.
- DA-50 Pro DAT - 1989, First US-legal DAT tape recorder with SCMS Copy protection.
- MSR-24 24-track 1" Open Reel Tape Deck - 1990 TEC Award Nominee
- DA-800/24 DASH 1990, 24-channel digital tape Recorder.
- DA-88 DTRS Eight-channel Digital Audio Recorder - 1994 TEC Award Winner, 1995 Emmy Award Winner, 1995 NAB Professional's Choice Award winner.
- DA-30mkII DAT - 1995 TEC Award Winner
- DA-38 DTRS - 1997 TEC Award Winner
- DA-98 DTRS - 1997 PAR Excellence Award, 1998 NAB Professional's Choice Award, 1998 TEC Award Winner
- DA-302 DAT - 1997 World's first Dual DAT deck. 1997 PAR Excellence Award Winner.
- DA-98HR 24-bit DTRS - 1998 Post Magazine Best Multitrack Digital Recorder.
- DA-45HR 24-bit DAT - World's first 24-bit DAT Recorder. 1998 PAR Excellence Award Winner, 1998 Keyboard Magazine Key Buy.
- DA-78HR 24-bit DTRS - 1999 Pro Audio Review PAR Excellence Award, 2000 TEC award Winner
- MMR-8 / MMR-16 eight-channel Hard Disk Recorder - 2000 Emmy Award Winner, 2001 Oscar Scientific Award Winner.
- MX-2424 24-channel 96 kHz Hard Disk Recorder - 1999 PAR Excellence Award Winner, 2001 TEC Award winner.
- DS-D98 Two-channel DSD Recorder based on DA-98HR - 2002 TEC Award Nominee.
- HD-P2 Portable Timecode enabled CF card two-channel recorder - 2006 PAR Award Winner.
- DV-RA1000HD DVD and Hard-Drive-based two-Channel Master DSD Recorder - 2007 TEC Award Winner.
- X-48 48-channel 96 kHz Hard Disk Recorder. - 2008 TEC Award Nominee
- DR-100 Two-channel Hand Held Recorder - 2009 TEC Award Nominee
- HS-P82 Eight-channel Dual CF Media Field Recorder - 2009 PAR Excellence Award, 2010 Good Design Award
- DR-03 Portable Handheld Recorder - 2010 Music & Sound Retailers Best Multitrack Award
- DR-680 eight-channel portable SD card recorder - 2011 TEC Award Nominee
- DR-40 Handheld four-track recorder - 2012 EM Magazine Editors Choice Awards
- DR-60D Four-track recorder for DSLR Cameras - 2013 NAB Best of Show Award
- DR-10L Micro Linear PCM Recorder and lav mic
- DR-10X Micro Linear PCM Recorder
- DR-05X Stereo Handheld Digital Audio Recorder and USB Audio Interface
- DR-07X Stereo Handheld Digital Audio Recorder and USB Audio Interface
- DR-08 Stereo Handheld Digital Audio Recorder
- DR-40X Four Track Digital Audio Recorder and USB Audio Interface
- DR-100MKIII Linear PCM Recorder

=== Mixers ===
- M-5 Analog Mixer - The Model 5 was released in 1975 in conjunction w/ the 80-8 eight channel 1/2 inch reel tape deck. It came as an 8x4x2 board, expandable to 12 channels w/ optional talkback module
- M-312 Analog Mixer - 12 channel mixing console
- M-520 Analog Mixer - 20 channel 8 bus mixing console
- M-700 Analog Mixer - 1989 dubbed "the Baby SSL"
- M-3700 Analog Mixer - 1992 TEC Award Nominee
- M-2600 Analog Mixer - 1995 TEC Award Nominee
- M-1600 Analog Mixer - 1997 TEC Award Nominee
- TM-D8000 Digital Audio Mixer - 1996 Blue Ribbon Best of AES Convention, 1998 TEC Award Nominee
- TM-D4000 Digital Audio Mixer - 2000 TEC Award Nominee
- X-9 Digital Four Channels DJ Mixer - 2000
- DM-24 Digital Audio Mixer - 2002 TEC Award winner
- DM-3200 Digital Audio Mixer - 32 Channels 16Buses 4-Band Parametric EQ
- DM-4800 64 channel Digital Audio Mixer - 2007 TEC Award Nominee 2007 Good Design Award

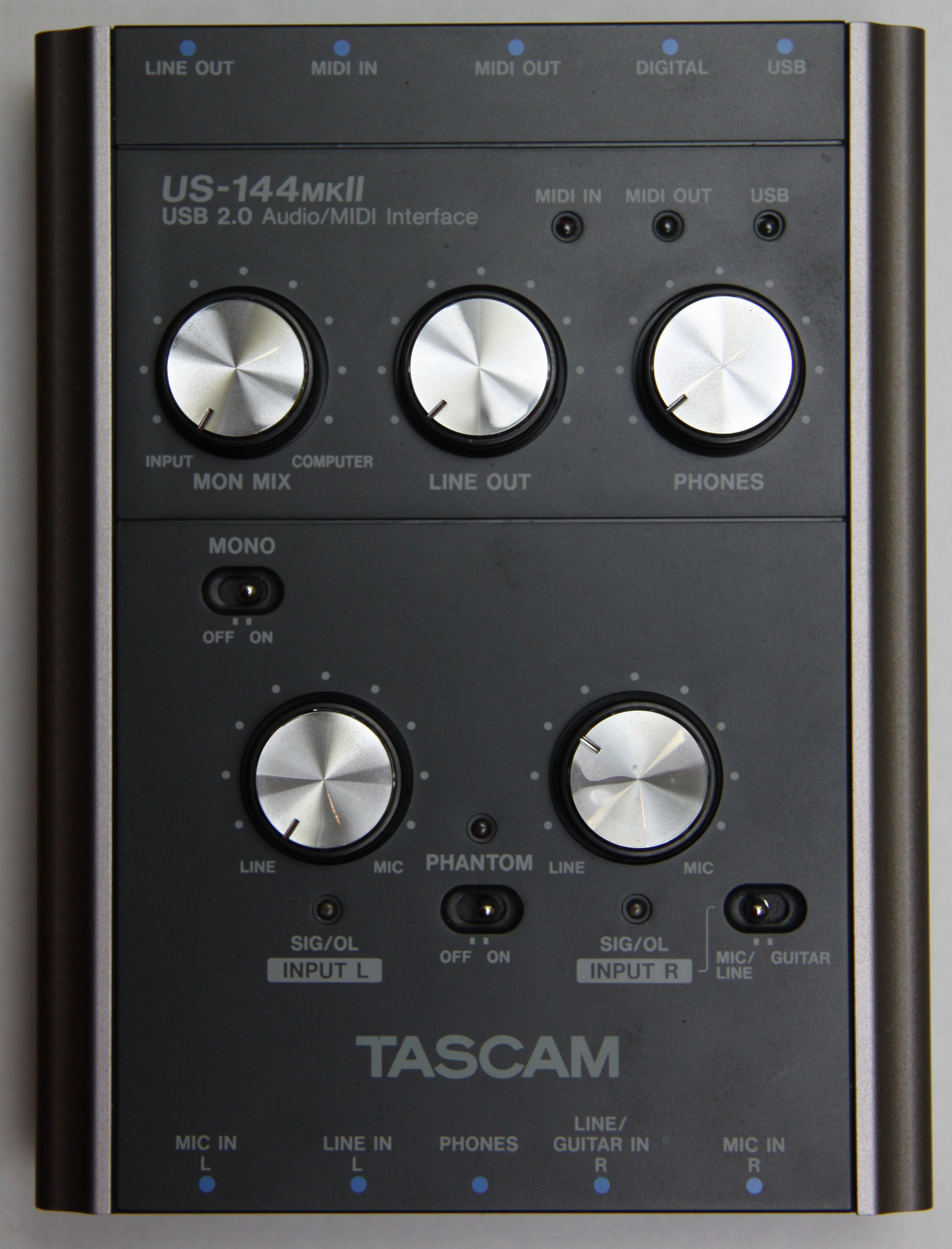
Audio interface US-144MKII

=== Computer audio interfaces and controllers ===
- US-428 - 2001 TEC Award Nominee
- FW-1884 - FireWire Audio and Control Surface - 2003 PAR Excellence Award
- US-122 - 2004 Soundcheck magazine Best Audio/MIDI Hardware
- US-2400 - 24 Fader USB Controller - 2004 Mix Magazine NAMM Show Certified Hit
- US-322 / US-366 - 2013 Visual Grand Prix Gold Award.
- US-144MKII (Discontinued for Mac OS Catalina)
- US-1x2HR 1Mic 2IN/2OUT High Resolution USB Audio Interface
- US-2x2HR 2Mic 2IN/2OUT High Resolution USB Audio Interface
- US-4x4HR 4Mic 4IN/4OUT High Resolution USB Audio Interface
- US-800 8in/4 out USB Audio/MIDI Interface
- Model 12 Integrated Production Suite Mixer/Recorder/DAW Controller
- Model 16 Integrated Production Suite All-In-One Mixer/Recorder/DAW Controller
- Model 24 Integrated Production Suite Multi-Track Live Recording Console Mixer/Recorder/DAW Controller
- Model 2400 Integrated Production Suite 24-Track Live Recording Console Mixer/Recorder/DAW Controller

=== Software ===
- Gigastudio 3 Sampler - 2004 Mix Magazine Certified Hit, 2005 TEC Award Winner, 2006 EM Editors's choice Award, 2006 MIPA Award.

=== Trainers ===
- CD-GT1 CD Based Trainer with time stretch and pitch change.
- GB-10 - guitar and bass trainer with MP files and adjustable speed and loop features.

=== Signal processors ===
- TA-1VP - Channel Strip with Antares AutoTune - 2011 TEC Award Nominee
