= David E. Blackmer =

American audio engineer

David E. Blackmer (January 11, 1927 – March 21, 2002) was an American audio electronics engineer, most famous as the inventor of the dbx noise reduction system and founder of dbx.

As well as audio noise reduction, Blackmer worked on extending the frequency response of audio electronics beyond the conventionally accepted audible range of 20 kHz. He also published research on the value of ultrasonic frequencies in sound reproduction, claiming that the time resolution of human hearing is 5 microseconds or better—which would correspond to a frequency of 200 kHz, requiring audio equipment ideally to have a flat response to that frequency.

Blackmer attended High Mowing School in Wilton, New Hampshire. He started in audio at Lafayette Radio in Boston in the 1940s and studied electronics in the U.S. Navy and at Harvard University and MIT. He later worked at Trans-Radio Recording Studio, Epsco, Hi-Con Eastern and Raytheon, where he designed telemetry systems for the Mercury space program. He founded dbx in 1971, selling it to BSR in 1979 and staying on with the company for several years. In the late 1980s he formed Earthworks, producing studio microphones, preamplifiers and studio reference monitors. He also founded Kintek (now Colortek) and Instrumentation Laboratory, as well as running the Cafe Pierrot restaurant in Wilton for a time.

Blackmer was a life member of the IEEE and a fellow of the Audio Engineering Society from 1976. He was also a great reader of science fiction. He had ten children.

== A partial list of patents held by David Blackmer ==
- U.S. patent 3,681,618, August 1, 1972: RMS Circuits with Bipolar Logarithmic Converter
- U.S. patent 3,714,462, January 30, 1973: Multiplier Circuits
- U.S. patent 4,403,199, September 6, 1983: Gain control systems
- U.S. patent 6,091,829, July 18, 2000: Microphone apparatus
- U.S. patent 6,526,149, February 25, 2003: System and method for reducing non linear electrical distortion in an electroacoustic device
