= Cappella dei Mercanti, Turin =

Cappella dei Mercanti
- Cappella dei Mercanti, Negozianti e Banchieri
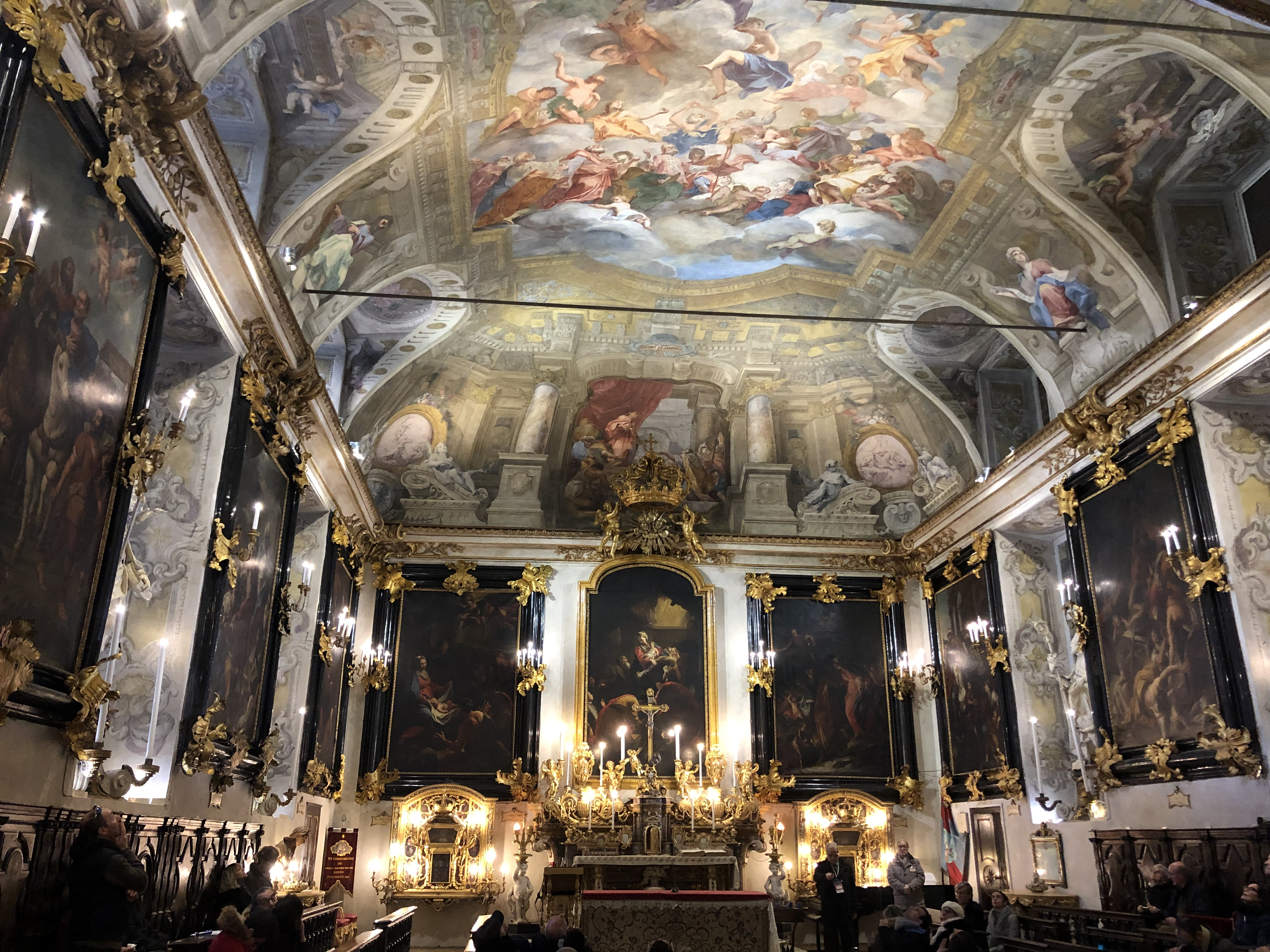
- Interior

- Map of Turin
- 45°04′23″N 7°40′46″E
- Country: Italy
- Denomination: Roman Catholic Church

Architecture
- Style: Baroque

Administration
- Archdiocese: Turin

The cappella dei Mercanti, Negozianti e Banchieri (chapel of merchants, shopkeepers, and bankers), better known as cappella dei Mercanti, is a Catholic chapel in the historic city center of Turin, Italy.

The chapel, whose construction was authorized during the 16th century, was built at the end of the 1600s and most of the artwork it contains originated in the 1600 and 1700s, in the baroque style.

The sacristy hosts the Perpetual Calendar built by the engineering Giovanni Plana, a primitive computing machine.

== History and description ==
The Pious Congregation of Bankers, Merchants and Merchants of Turin was chartered in 1663, and built its own chapel inside the Jesuit palace, on the city block of San Paolo (owned by the congregation itself) on Via Dora Grossa, now Via Garibaldi. The space is adjacent to the sixteenth century Church of the Holy Martyrs, which was staffed by the Jesuits. The chapel was built during the rectorate of the Fr. Agostino Provana (1680-1726). Inaugurated in 1692, the large rectangular hall was decorated in the following years thanks to the guidance of Provana.

The theme of the interior decorations is the Epiphany, which represents the manifestation of Christ to the powerful of the earth and on which day the Congregation celebrates its own feast.

The walls of the chapel present numerous seventeenth-century paintings, all inspired by the theme of the Biblical Magi. On the left wall Herod with the Magi and the wise men (circa 1694) by Sebastiano Taricco, Journey of the Magi towards Bethlehem (circa 1694) by Luigi Vannier, Opening of the treasures of the Wise Men (1705) by Stefano Maria Legnani (called Legnanino), and Announcement of the angel to the Magi circa 1694) by Sebastiano Taricco. On the left wall Appearance of the star to the Magi (1703) by Andrea Pozzo, King David meditates on the mystery of the Epiphany (circa 1695) by Stefano Maria Legnani, Massacre of the Innocents (1703) by Andrea Pozzo, and Procession of the Magi into Jerusalem (1712) by Niccolò Carone. The paintings are alternated with marbled wooden statues made by Carlo Giuseppe Plura between 1707 and 1715 depicting popes and Church Fathers; John Chrysostom, Gregory the Great, and Saint Ambrose on the left wall and Saint Jerome, Saint Leo the Great, and Saint Augustine on the right wall. Plana also carved the marble bust of the Madonna to the left of the altar.

The altar dates back to 1797 and is the work of Michele Emanuele Buscaglione. On either side there are two reliquaries, while on the wall there are three paintings by the Jesuit painter Andrea Pozzo: Nativity with shepherds (1699 circa), Adoration of the Magi (before 1694), and Flight to Egypt (around 1699). The baroque frescoed ceiling by Legnanino depicts Heaven, prophets, sibyls and biblical episodes and dates to 1694-1695. The organ on the wall opposite the altar dates back to the eighteenth century.

In the sacristy there are the altarpiece Adoration of the Magi (circa 1620) by Guglielmo Caccia (called Moncalvo), and a Piccolo Trono (1792) by Michele Brassiè, together with a Natale Favriano wardrobe from 1712. The sacristy also houses precious Antependi and the archive of the Congregation.

On 21 January 2017 the chapel was returned to the public after a period of renovation.

== Perpetual calendar ==
The sacristy contains several sacred objects, but above all the famous Perpetual Calendar by Giovanni Plana, one of the oldest calculator machines (it is equipped with rotating drums and a transmission system that allows the correct combination of the various information contained in the system) which allows precise calendrical calculation over a period of 4000 years starting from year zero (including the calculation of lunations, days of the week and Christian holidays).

== Gallery ==
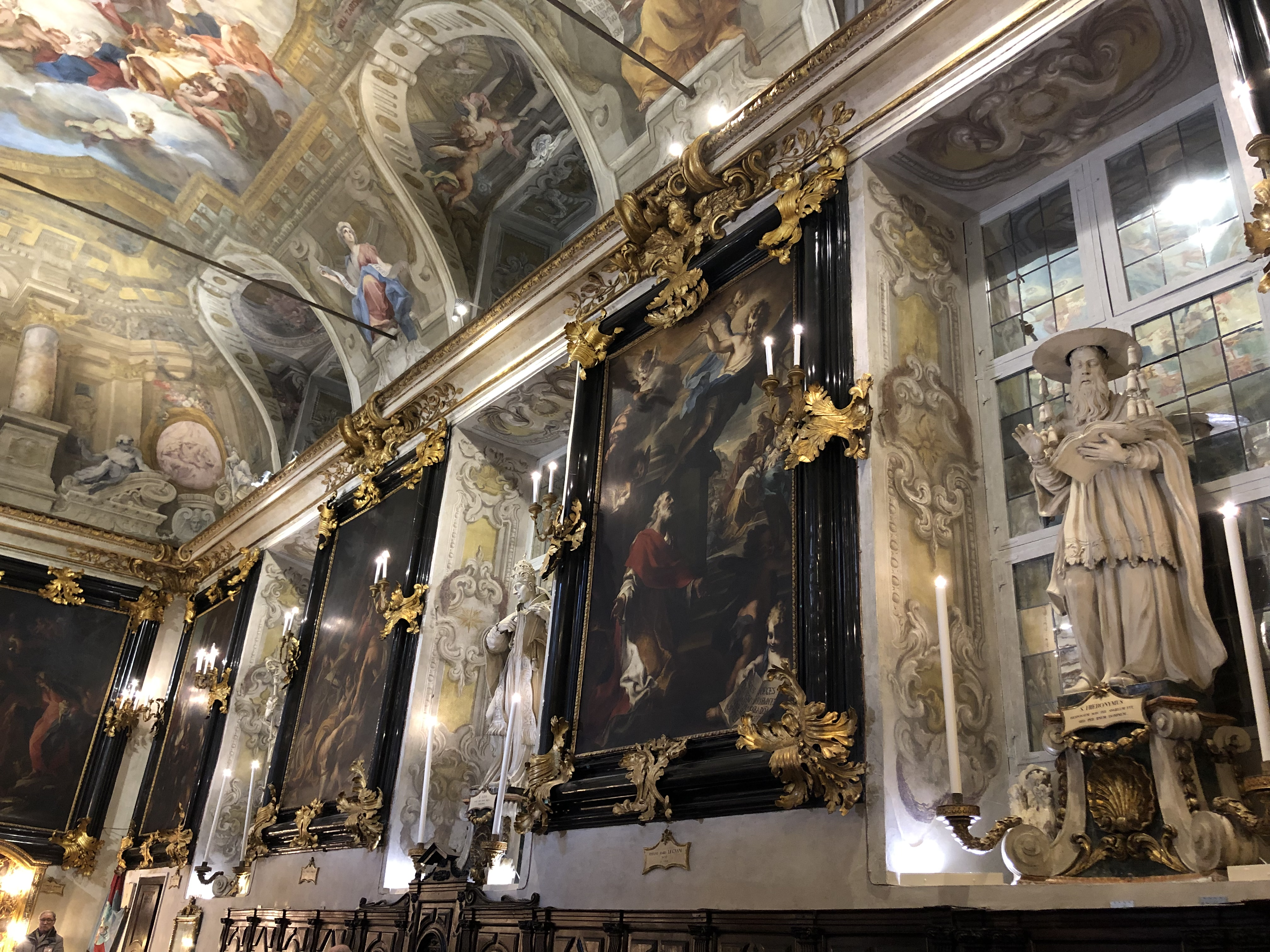
Right wall

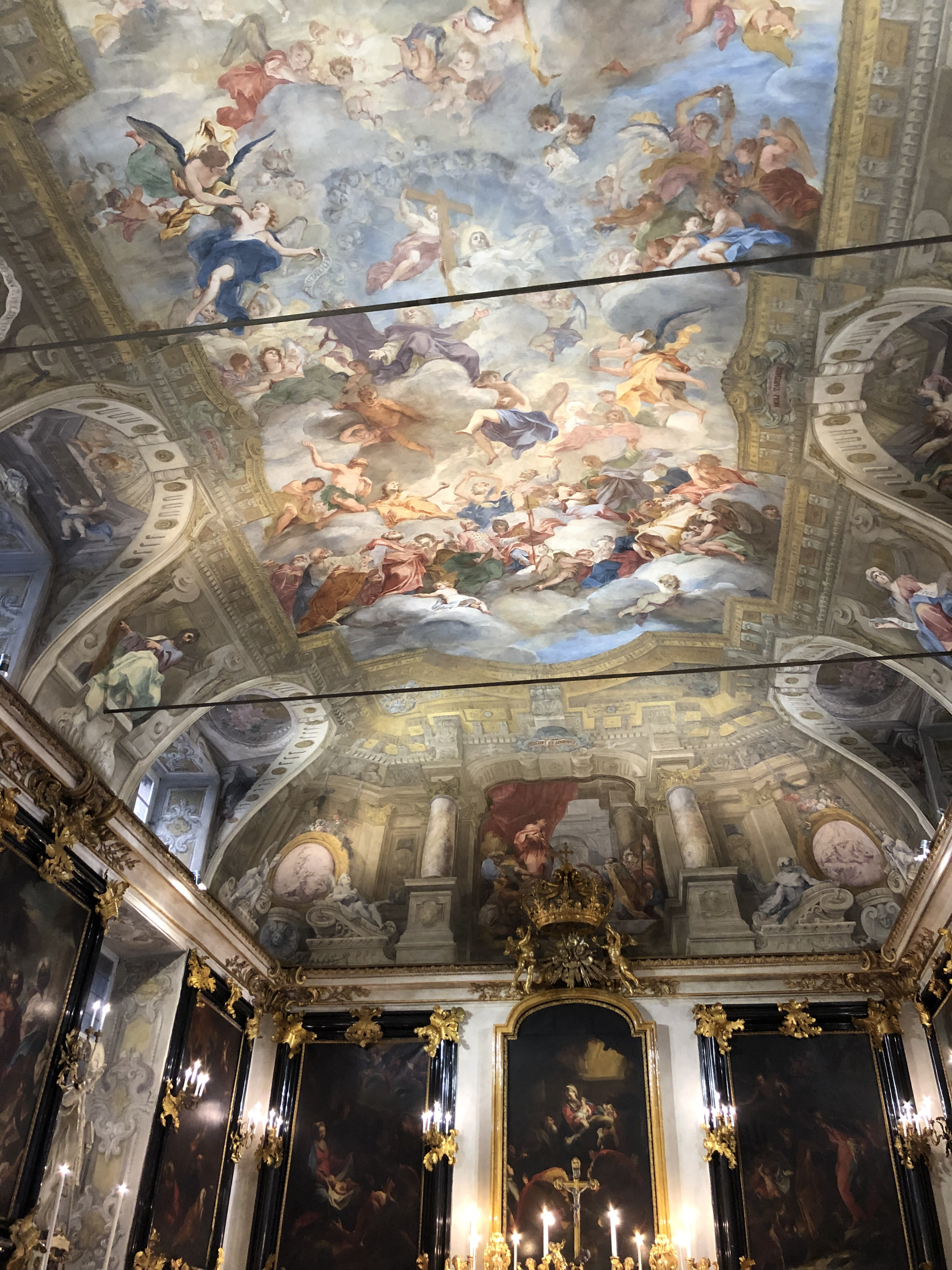
Ceiling frescoed by Stefano Maria Legnani

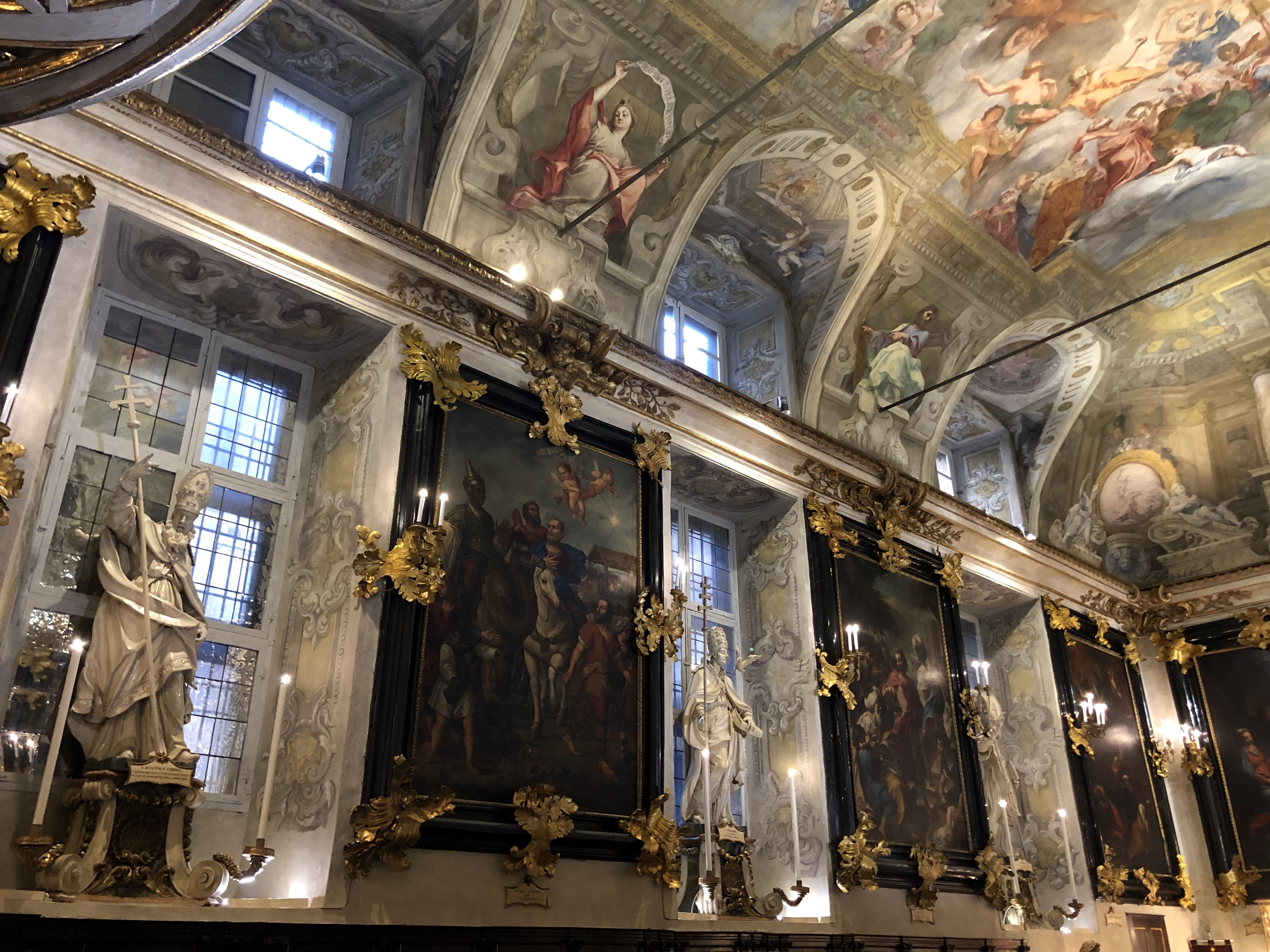
Left wall

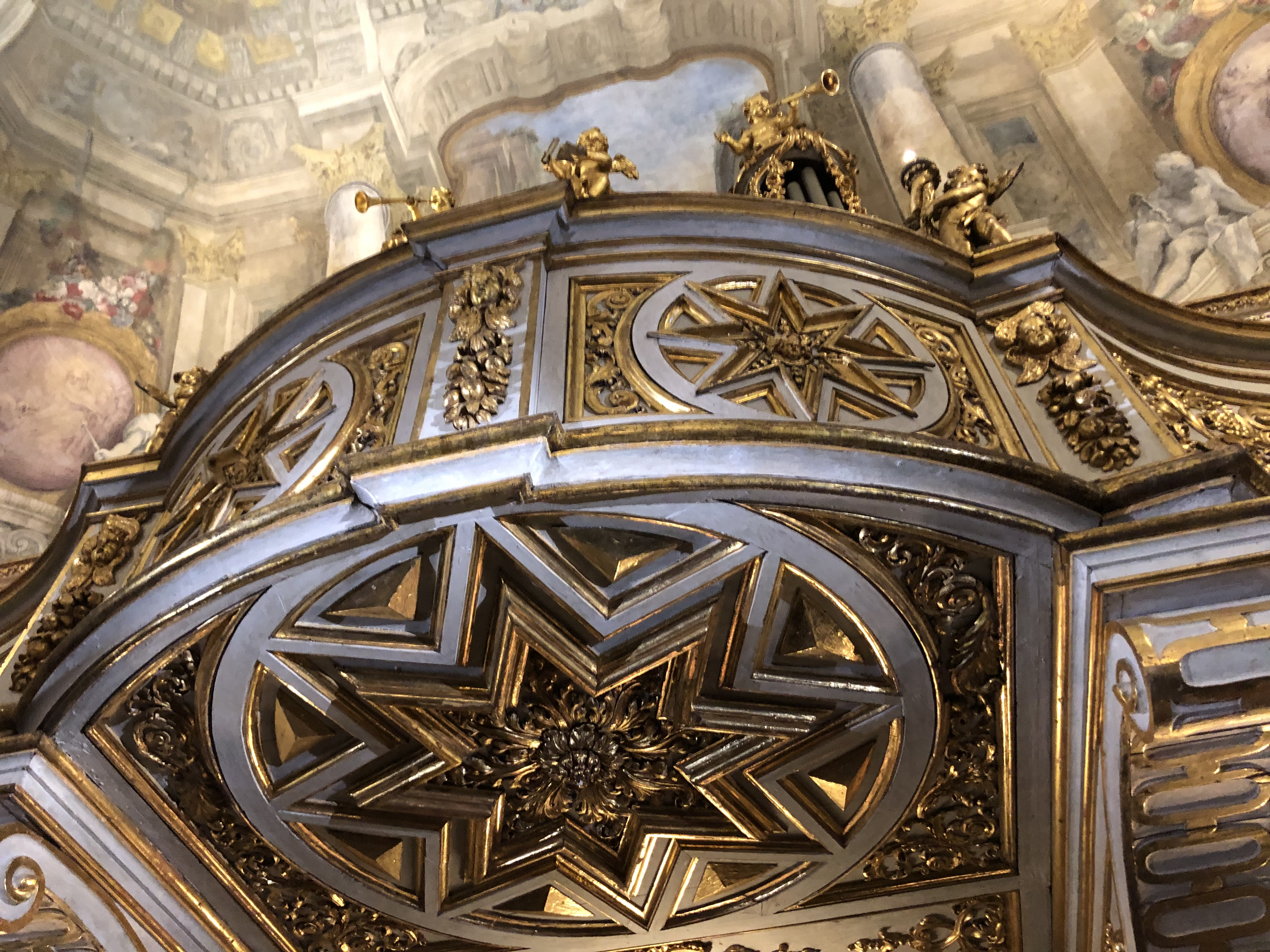
Organ

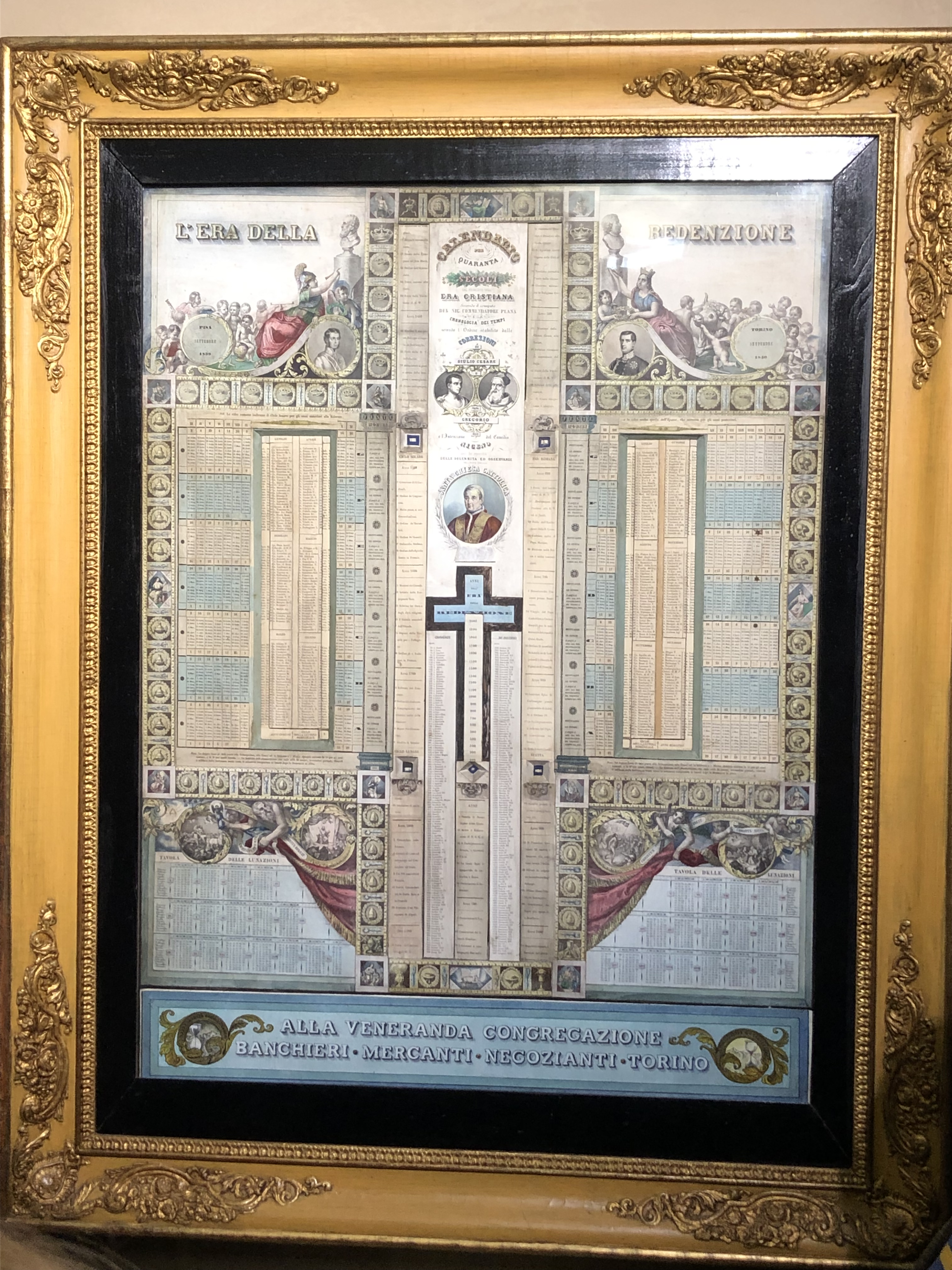
Perpetual Calendar

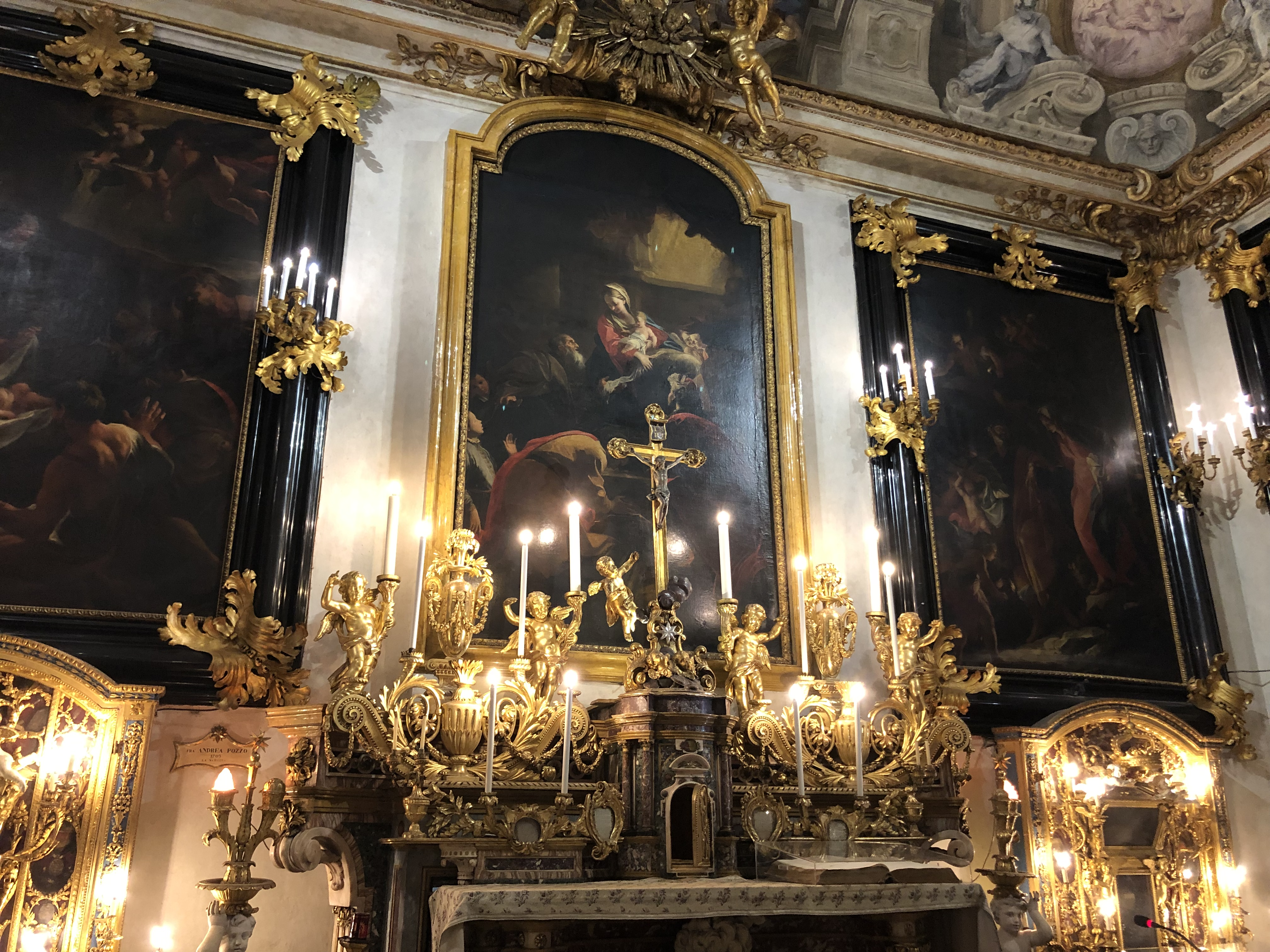
Altar with altarpieces by Andrea Pozzo
