= Taricco =

Taricco is a surname. Notable people with the surname include:

- Mauricio Taricco (born 1973), Argentine footballer
- Sebastiano Taricco (1645–1710), Italian painter
