= Hybrid computer =

Combination of analog and digital computer

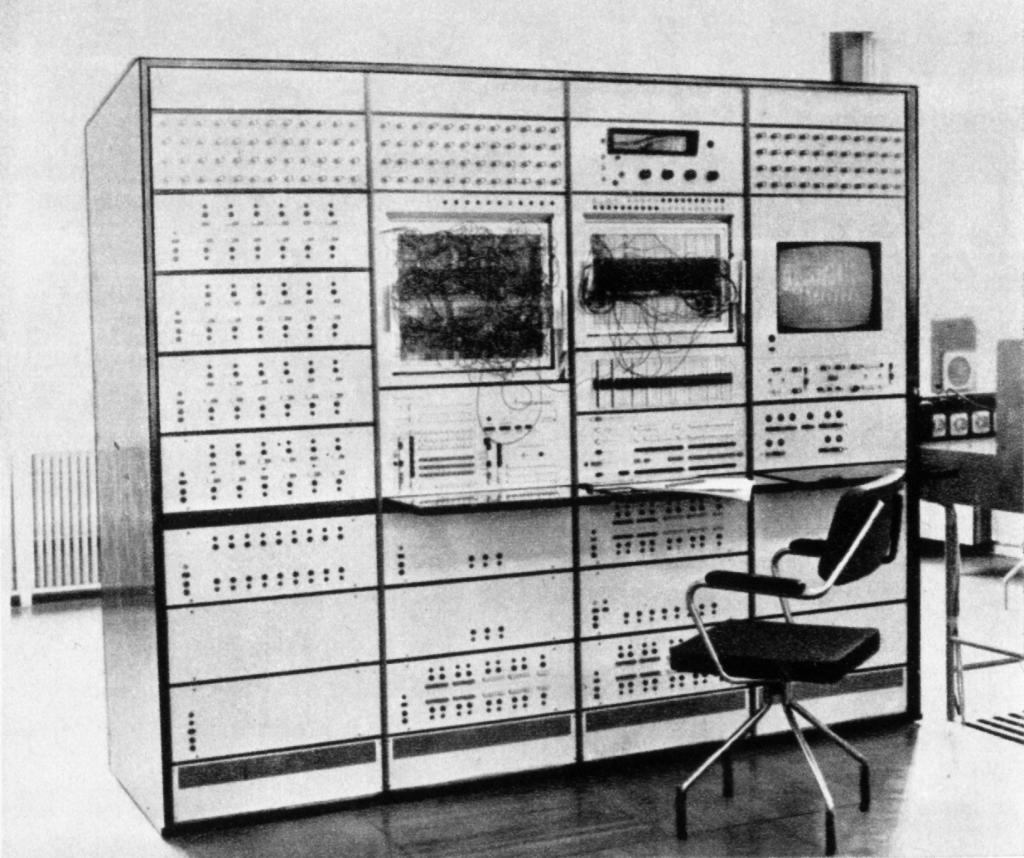
Polish hybrid computer WAT 1001

Hybrid computers are computers that exhibit features of analog computers and digital computers. The digital component normally serves as the controller and provides logical and numerical operations, while the analog component often serves as a solver of differential equations and other mathematically complex problems.

== History ==
The first desktop hybrid computing system was the Hycomp 250, released by Packard Bell in 1961. Another early example was the HYDAC 2400, an integrated hybrid computer released by EAI in 1963. In the 1980s, Marconi Space and Defense Systems Limited (under Peggy Hodges) developed their "Starglow Hybrid Computer", which consisted of three EAI 8812 analog computers linked to an EAI 8100 digital computer, the latter also being linked to an SEL 3200 digital computer. Late in the 20th century, hybrids dwindled with the increasing capabilities of digital computers including digital signal processors.

In general, analog computers are extraordinarily fast, since they are able to solve most mathematically complex equations at the rate at which a signal traverses the circuit, which is generally an appreciable fraction of the speed of light. On the other hand, the precision of analog computers is not good; they are limited to three, or at most, four digits of precision.

Digital computers can be built to take the solution of equations to almost unlimited precision, but quite slowly compared to analog computers. Generally, complex mathematical equations are approximated using iterative methods which take huge numbers of iterations, depending on how good the initial "guess" at the final value is and how much precision is desired. (This initial guess is known as the numerical "seed".) For many real-time operations in the 20th century, such digital calculations were too slow to be of much use (e.g., for very high frequency phased array radars or for weather calculations), but the precision of an analog computer is insufficient.

Hybrid computers can be used to obtain a very good but relatively imprecise 'seed' value, using an analog computer front-end, which is then fed into a digital computer iterative process to achieve the final desired degree of precision. With a three or four digit, highly accurate numerical seed, the total digital computation time to reach the desired precision is dramatically reduced, since many fewer iterations are required. One of the main technical problems to be overcome in hybrid computers is minimizing digital-computer noise in analog computing elements and grounding systems.

Consider that the nervous system in animals is a form of hybrid computer. Signals pass across the synapses from one nerve cell to the next as discrete (digital) packets of chemicals, which are then summed within the nerve cell in an analog fashion by building an electro-chemical potential until its threshold is reached, whereupon it discharges and sends out a series of digital packets to the next nerve cell. The advantages are at least threefold: noise within the system is minimized (and tends not to be additive), no common grounding system is required, and there is minimal degradation of the signal even if there are substantial differences in activity of the cells along a path (only the signal delays tend to vary). The individual nerve cells are analogous to analog computers; the synapses are analogous to digital computers.

Hybrid computers are distinct from hybrid systems. The latter may be no more than a digital computer equipped with an analog-to-digital converter at the input and/or a digital-to-analog converter at the output, to convert analog signals for ordinary digital signal processing, and conversely, e.g., for driving physical control systems, such as servomechanisms.

== VLSI hybrid computer chip ==
In 2015, researchers at Columbia University published a paper on a small scale hybrid computer in 65 nm CMOS technology. This 4th-order VLSI hybrid computer contains 4 integrator blocks, 8 multiplier/gain-setting blocks, 8 fanout blocks for distributing current-mode signals, 2 ADCs, 2 DACs and 2 SRAMs blocks. Digital controllers are also implemented on the chip for executing the external instructions. A robot experiment in the paper demonstrates the use of the hybrid computing chip in today's emerging low-power embedded applications.
