= The Analog Thing =

Analog computer by anabrid GmbH

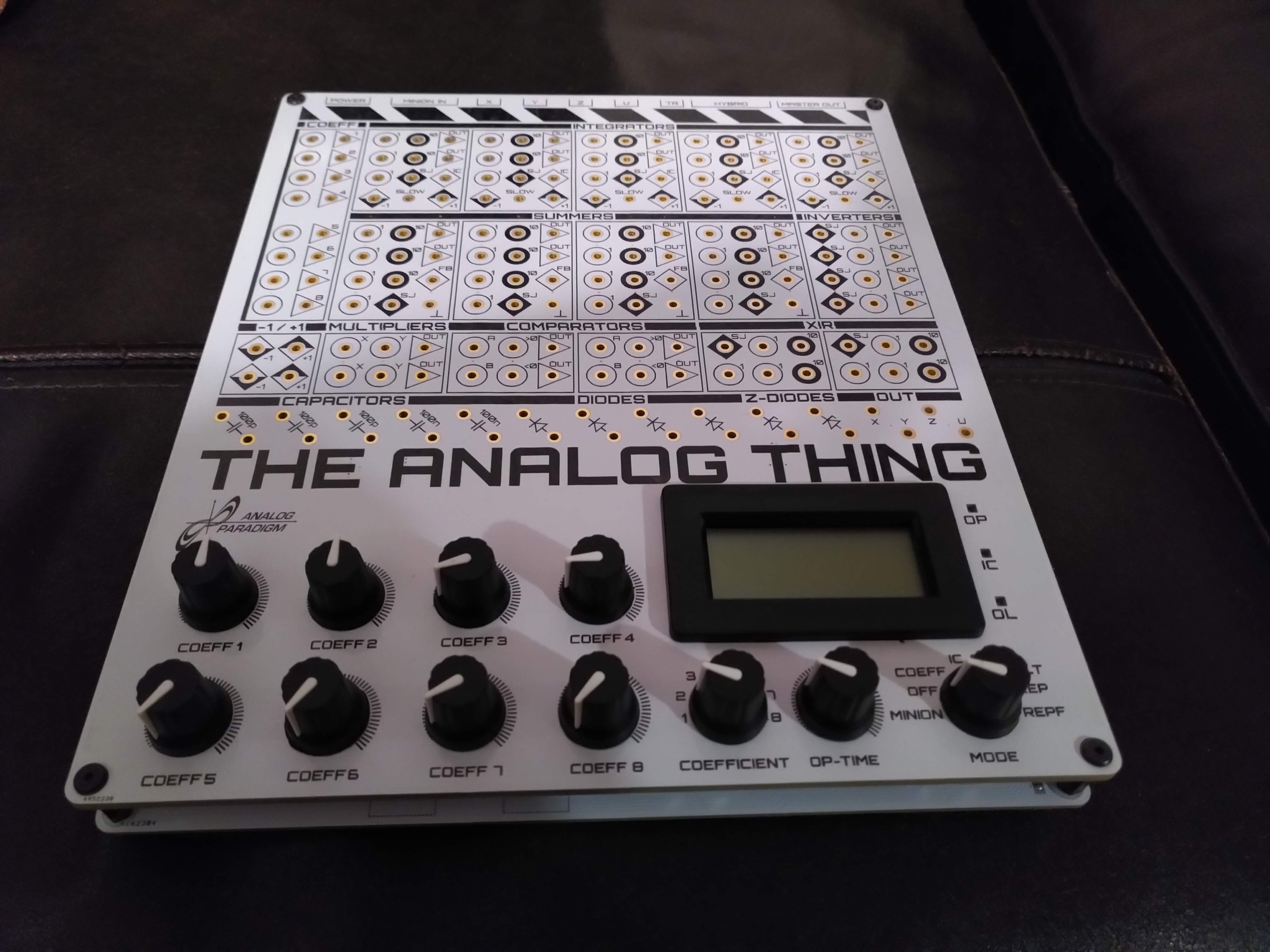
- THE ANALOG THING without patch cables
- Also known as: THAT
- Developer: Anabrid GmbH
- Manufacturer: Anabrid GmbH
- Released: 2021
- Connectivity: Analog input and output, hybrid port, master and minion ports
- Power: USB type C
- Dimensions: 24.1 x 20.3 x 3.7 centimetres
- Weight: 630 grams
- Marketing target: Education, science and hobbyists
- Website: the-analog-thing.org

The Analog Thing (stylized in uppercase and abbreviated THAT) is a small universal electronic analog computer produced by anabrid GmbH in Germany.

Its production began in 2021. The system is mainly targeted at the markets of education and science.

== Overview ==
The Analog Thing is equipped with eight adjustable coefficients, five analog integrators, four summers, two multipliers, two comparators, and several inverters, resistor networks, capacitors, diodes, and Z-diodes.

It has four analog output lines that can be connected to either an oscilloscope, an analog to digital converter or voltmeters.

The computer is programmed with patch cables connecting the components on a switching board. It can, additionally, be partly controlled from a digital computer via a hybrid port.

If an application requires more computing elements than are available on a single machine, two or more THATs can be coupled via dedicated interfaces referred to as MASTER and MINION ports. The number of computers that can be linked with a MASTER-MINION chain is theoretically unlimited.

== Usage ==
Typical use cases in education and theory include the analog modelling of time-based dynamical systems, e.g. mass-spring systems, population dynamics, epidemiological prevalence in the evolution of diseases, mathematical attractors, radioactive decay in nuclear physics, chemical reactions and neuronal bursting.

== Public reception ==
In 2024, The Analog Thing received both the iF Design award and the Red Dot design prize for its construction. According to Red Dot "the circuit board-like appearance, versatile use and future-focused conception" are among its outstanding design principles.

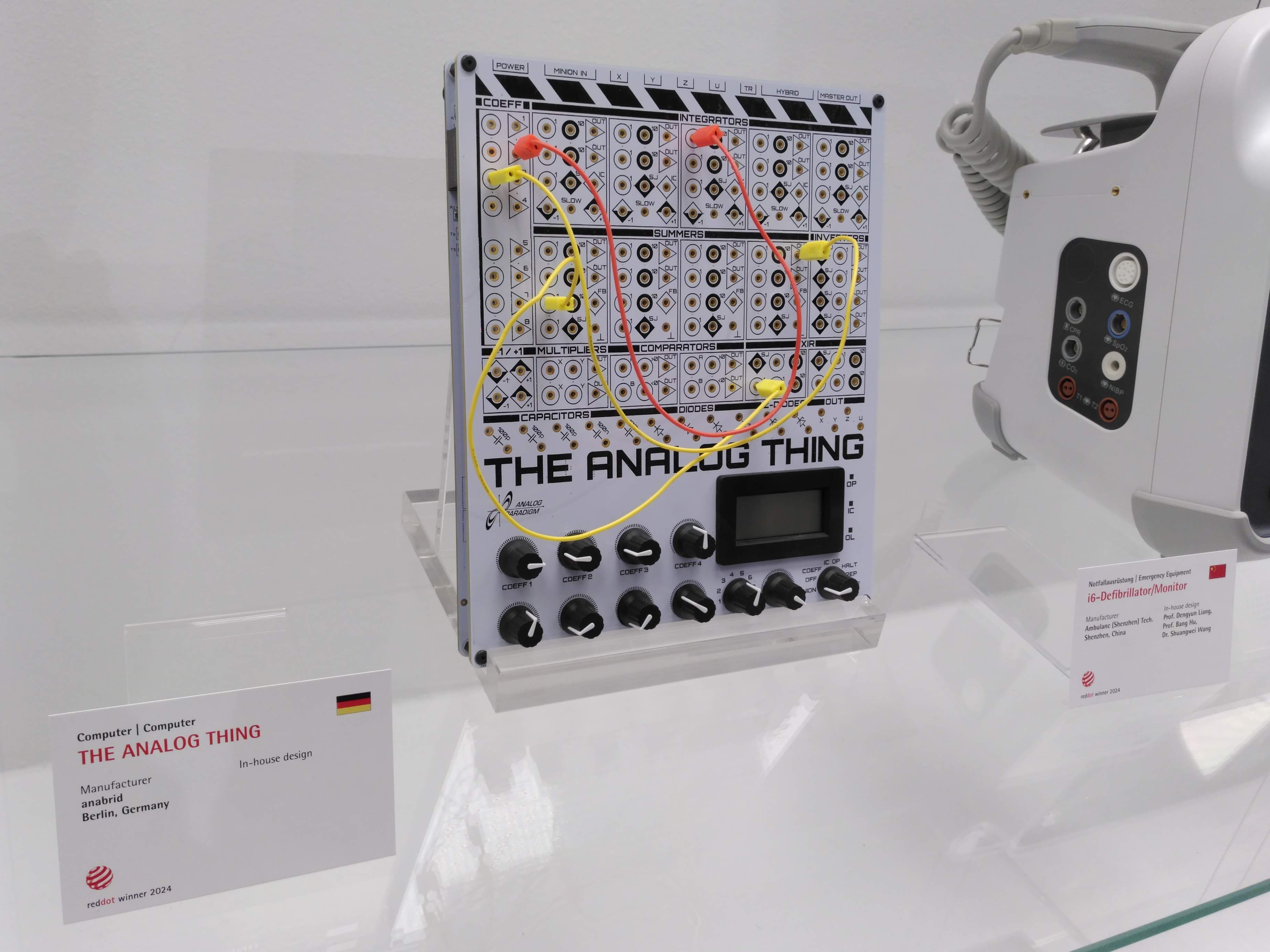
Exhibited in the red dot design museum in Essen, Germany

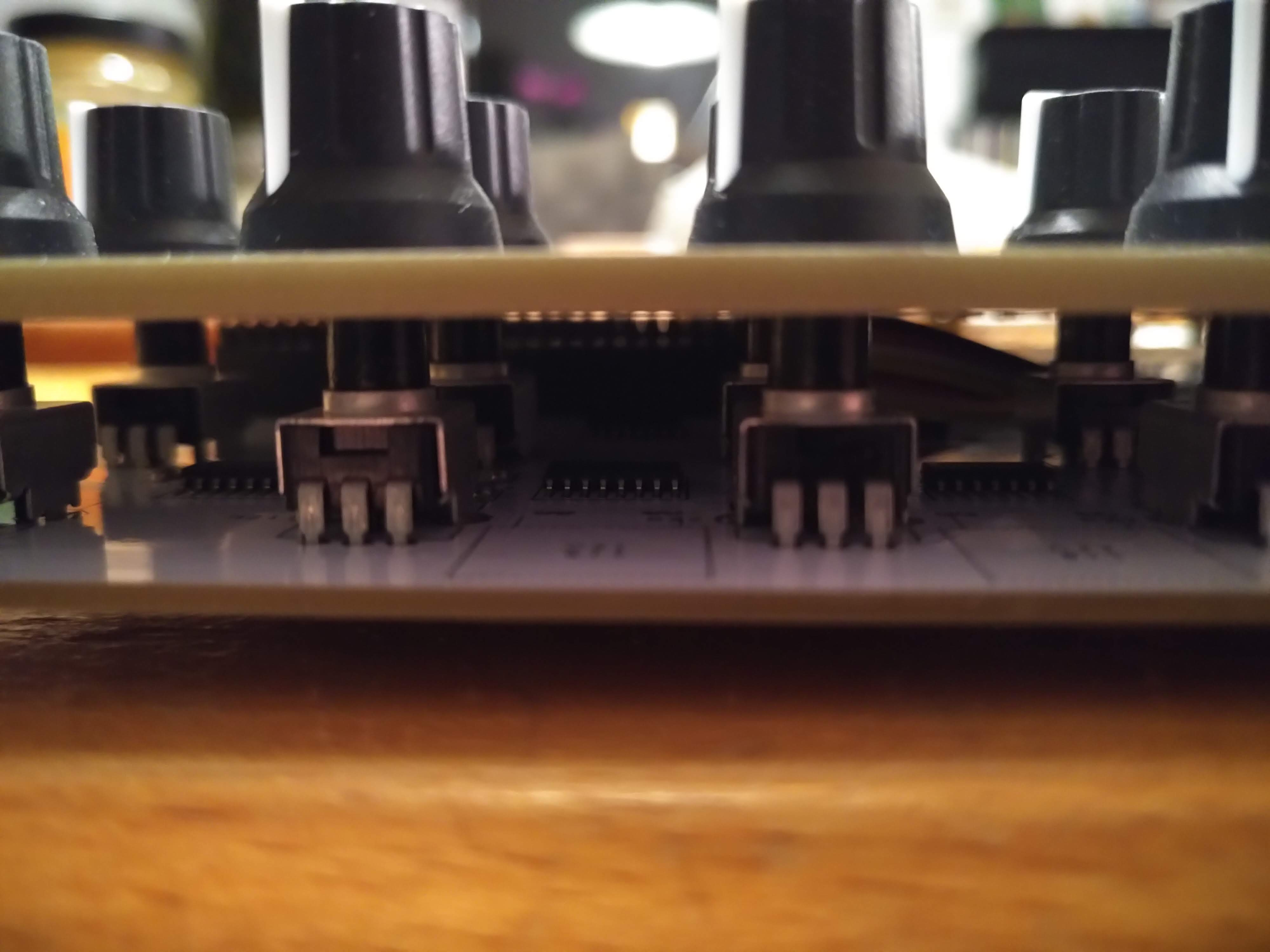
Closeup view of The Analog Thing

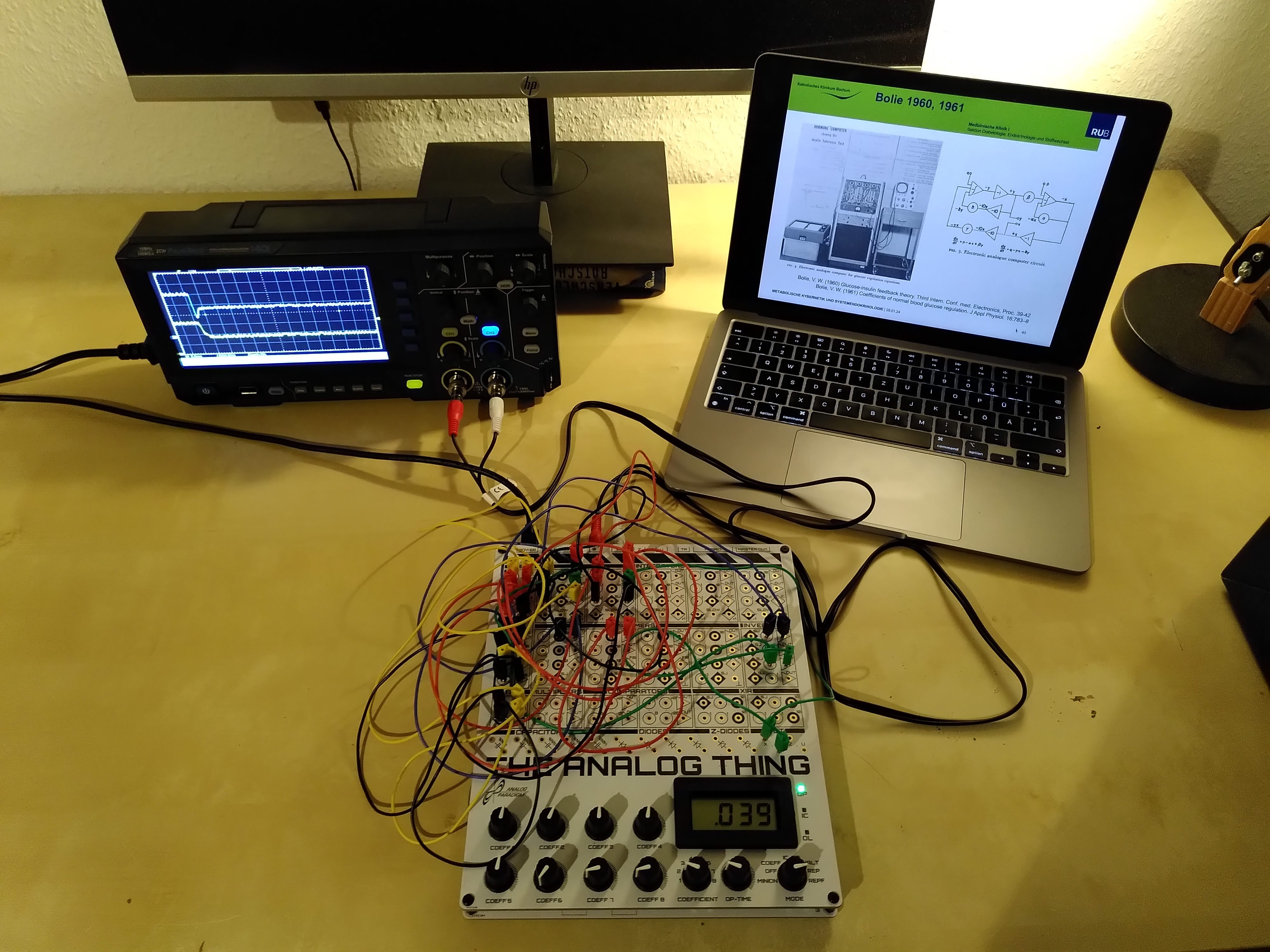
Model of insulin-glucose homeostasis by Bolie simulated with The Analog Thing.

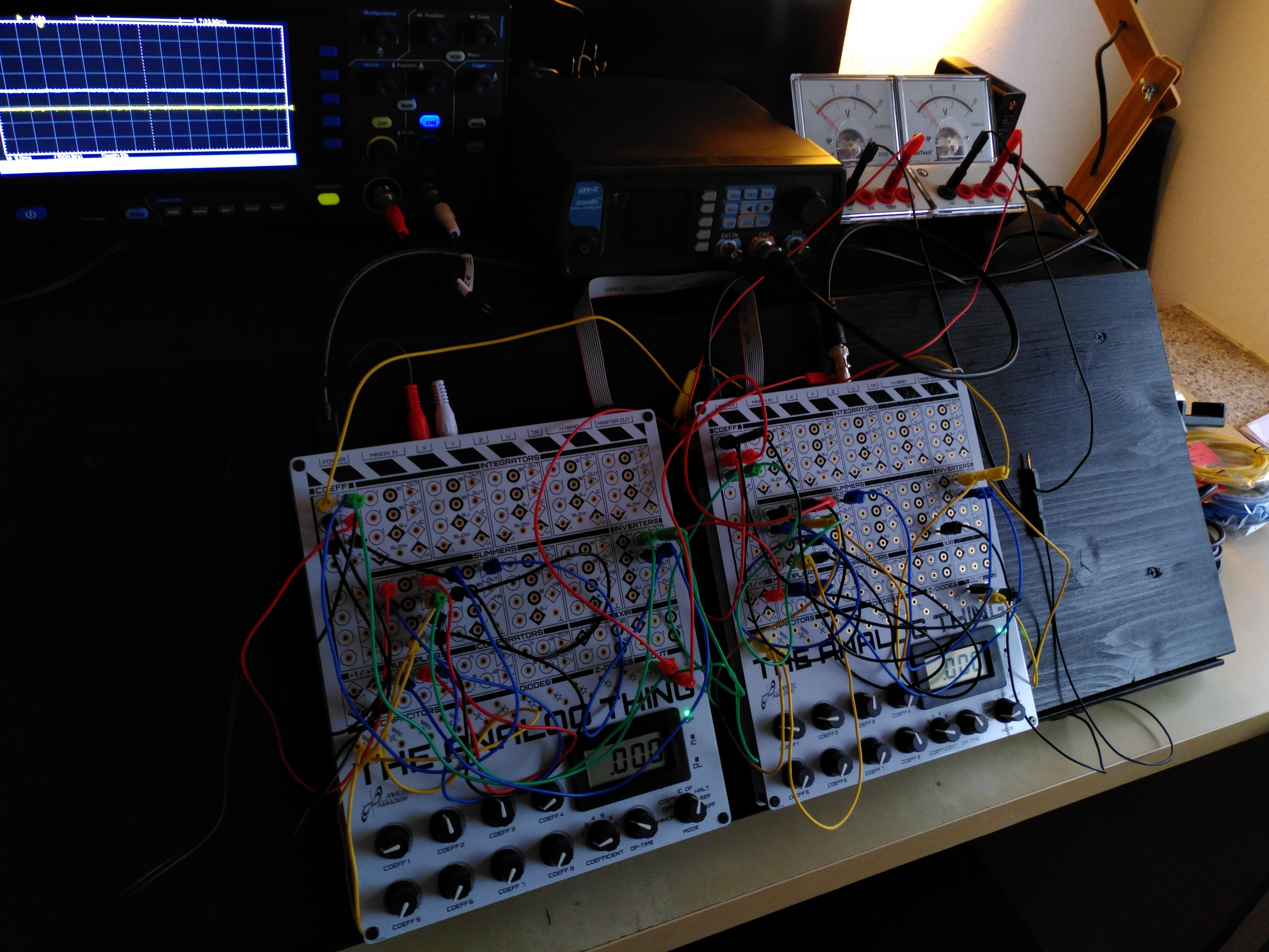
Two computers coupled via the MASTER/MINION interface.
