= Stefano Maria Legnani =

Italian painter

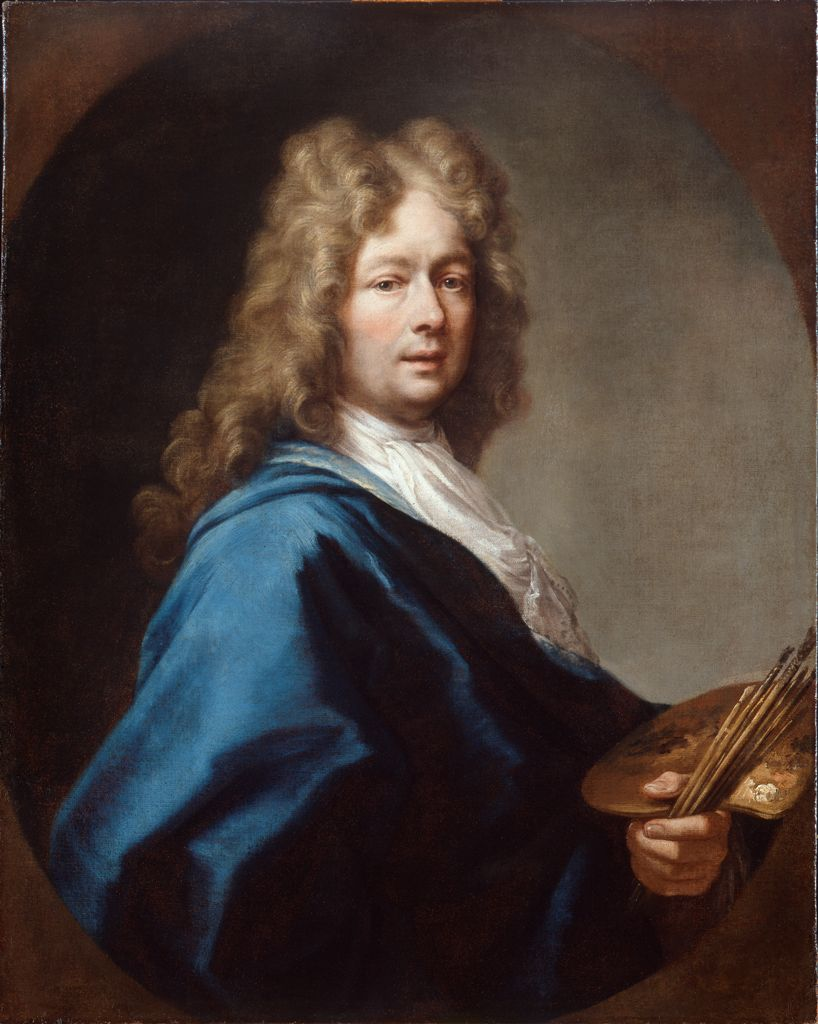
Self-portrait of Stefano Legnani

Stefano Maria Legnani also known as "Legnanino" (Milan, 6 April 1661 – Milan, 4 May 1713) was an Italian painter of the late Baroque period, active mainly in Milan. He is considered one of the most innovative exponents of the Milanese school of painting of around the turn of the 17th and 18th centuries.

== Life ==
Legnanino was born in Milan as the first born son of the painter Giovanni Ambrogio Legnani and Isabella Bussola. His grandfather Tommaso Legnani was also a painter.

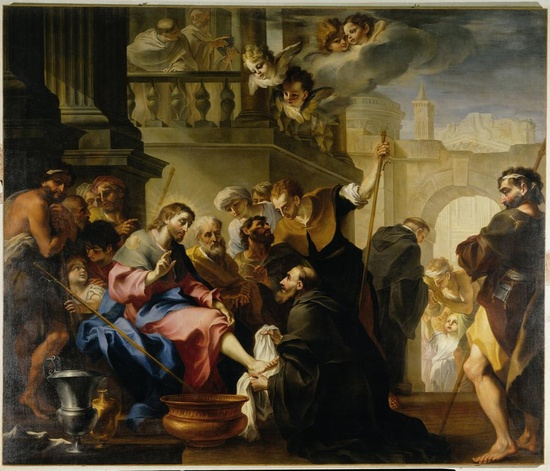
St. Augustine washes the feet of Jesus

Legnanino likely received his first art training with his father. It has been conjectured that subsequently he went on to work in the studio of Carlo Cignani in Bologna from 1683 to 1686, and then apprenticed with Carlo Maratta in Rome. However, neither of these apprenticeships are confirmed by documentation.

On 30 October 1694 the artist married Caterina Sanpietro, with whom he had three daughters. In that year he also received an important commission from Count Ottavio Provana di Druent to paint a series of celebratory frescoes in his residence, today known as Palazzo Falletti Barolo. The works he realised there established his reputation and were instrumental in him obtaining in 1695 a very prestigious commission to create the fresco decorations for the new palace of Emmanuel Philibert, Prince of Carignano. This palace had been designed by Guarino Guarini.

In 1695 Legnanino joined the local Academy of St. Lucas, and became its director in 1698. In 1703 he bought a noble residence in Milan for which he paid a high price, a sign of his success.

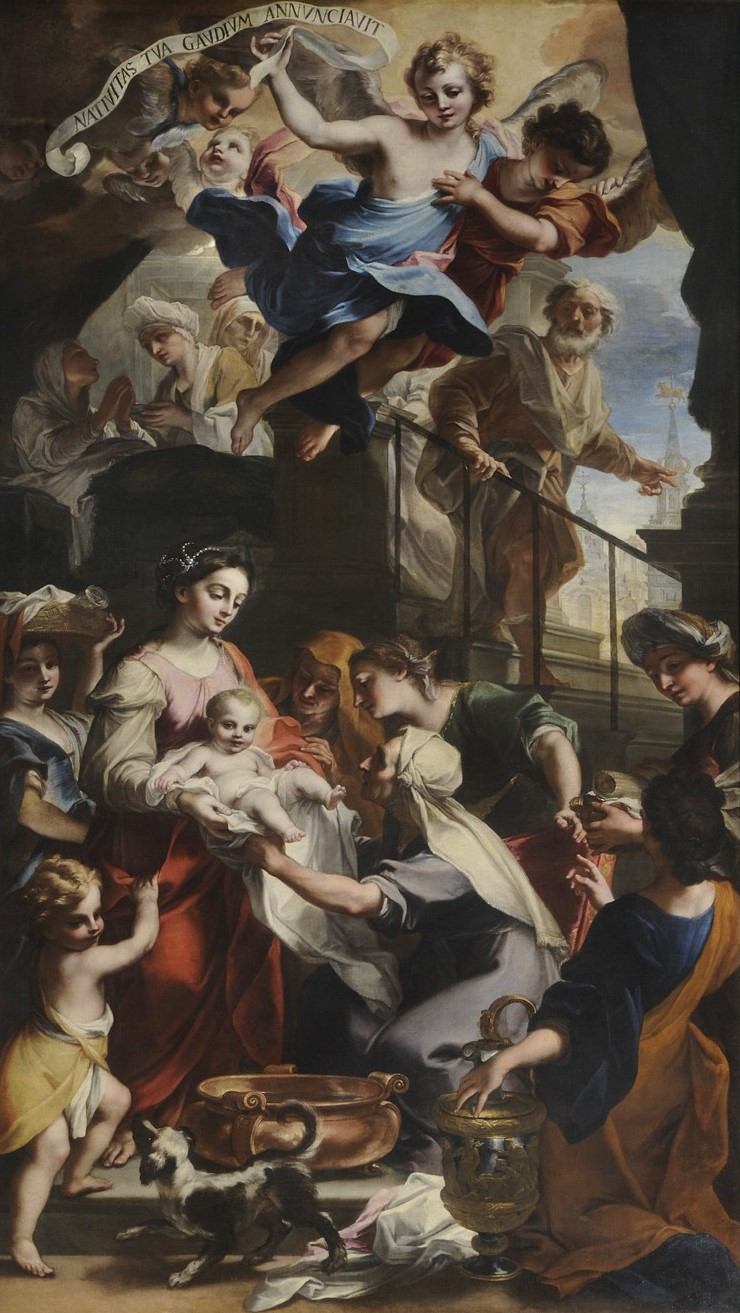
Nativity with in the background the civic tower and the church of San Lorenzo

In Novara, he painted the cupola of San Gaudenzio. In Milan, he painted frescoes of the life of St James at the church of Sant'Angelo. He also painted frescoes in the Cathedral of Monza. He also painted in Turin and Genoa.

Legnanino died in Milan on 4 May 1713 at the age of 52.

== Work ==
The artist was a canvas and fresco painter whose principal works were religious compositions painted for the various religious institutions and churches in and around Milan. He also painted important commissions in the palaces of the local aristocracy.

His work shows the influence of Correggio and Parmigianino in his palette, mixed with the tradition of Roman classicism. In his compositions the architectural structures and the figures merge seamlessly and he blends nuanced shades and bright colors.
