= Sebastiano Taricco =

Italian painter

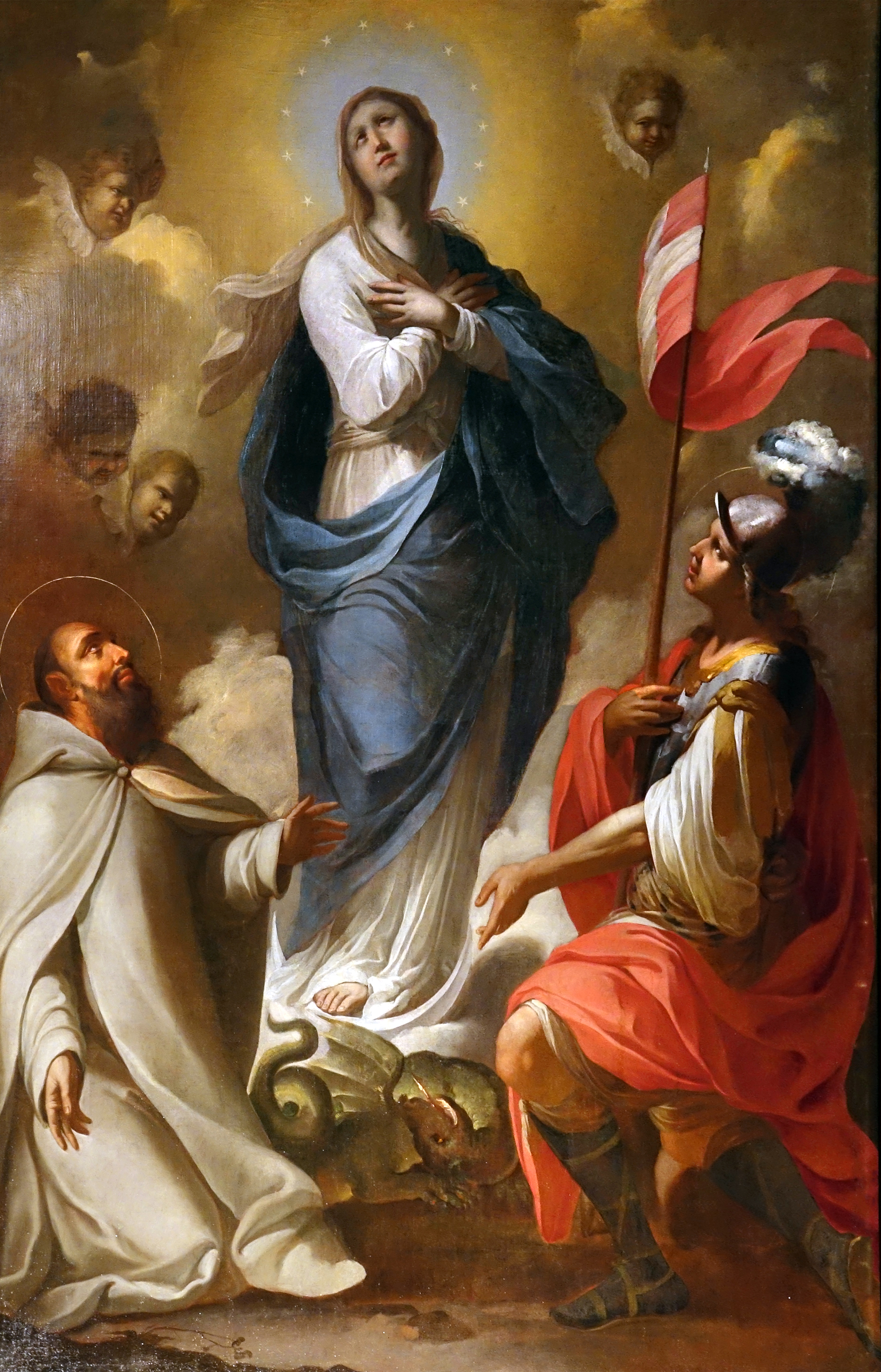
Immacolata e Santi, circa 1680

Sebastiano Taricco (1645–1710) was an Italian painter of the Baroque period.

Taricco was born in Cherasco, a city of the Piedmont, while some claimed he studied along with Guido Reni and with Domenichino in the school of the Caracci, his lifespan indicates otherwise, and likely he was a follower of their styles or those of their followers, Carlo Francesco Nuvolone and Giovanni Peruzzini.
