= John Bendor-Samuel =

Evangelical Christian missionary and linguist (1929–2011)

- Born: 9 June 1929; Worthing, Sussex, UK
- Died: 6 January 2011 (aged 81); Studley Green, Buckinghamshire, UK
- Education: Christ Church, Oxford; London University
- Occupations: Missionary; Linguist

John Theodore Bendor-Samuel (9 June 1929 – 6 January 2011) was an evangelical Christian missionary and linguist who furthered Bible translation work into African languages, as well as making significant contributions to the study of African linguistics. Amongst his friends and colleagues he was widely known by his initials, JBS.

He had an instrumental role in the founding of Wycliffe Bible Translators UK; the West Africa Linguistics Society and the Forum of Bible Agencies International. He pioneered SIL International's work in several countries in West Africa.

== Life and work ==
=== Early life and education ===
John Bendor-Samuel was born in the British seaside town of Worthing on 9 June 1929, the son of Rev. Theodore Harold and Dorothy Ruth Bendor-Samuel. Both of his parents were church ministers, and his father's ministry commitments led the family to move several times during the early years of John's life: first to Winchester when he was 2 years old, then to Hereford in 1945, followed by a move to West Norwood 4 years later. John himself embraced evangelical Christianity at a young age, and was baptised in June 1943.

The academic dedication he was to show in later life was evident from an early age. His father recalled how as a young boy he used to open his schoolbooks and start his homework as soon as he got home from lessons. This commitment to study continued and at the end of secondary school, he was accepted into Oxford University to study history.

Between his secondary education and attending university, Bendor-Samuel had to spend two years doing National Service in the army. As he felt called by God to go into mission work in later life, he expressed a desire to spend his period of service overseas, but this request was declined several times due to his usefulness as an instructor in England. Eventually, he decided to resign from his position, and was able to spend the second year of his National Service in the Middle East.

After his National Service was completed, he began studying for his undergraduate degree in history at Christ Church, Oxford. He graduated in 1952 and, spurred by a desire to work in a Bible teaching position oversees, he moved to London University to work towards two postgraduate diplomas, firstly in Education and then in Theology.

=== Linguistics training and the move abroad ===
In 1953, while studying for his diploma in theology, he attended a training course run by the Summer Institute of Linguistics at the London Bible College. The first course of its kind in the UK, it was designed to equip prospective and current missionaries to better acquire proficiency in non-European languages. Despite the current pressures on his time, the course appealed to Bendor-Samuel as he was aware of the importance of language learning skills for missionaries. He also had memories of his shortcomings in the discipline earlier in life, remarking that his school language lessons had been "dismal and depressing" and jokingly admitting that he did not know "the difference between a glottal stop and a bus stop". Unable to afford the residential fee for the course, he lived at his parents' house in West Norwood, cycling to and from the college each day and working on completing his theology diploma when he got home at night. By the end of the course, he discovered that he enjoyed linguistics, and was invited to take on a role of organising and publicising the same course for the following year.

As part of this position, Bendor-Samuel essentially turned his attic bedroom into the UK office of Wycliffe Bible Translators. With the help of his brother David, he also bought a motorcycle and side-car, which he used to travel around areas near London promoting the work of Wycliffe and searching for a location for the next year's course.

Following the 1954 SIL course, which was held in Chigwell, Essex, Bendor-Samuel decided to join Wycliffe Bible Translators. Encouraged to engage in further linguistics study to equip him for work with Wycliffe, he enrolled on a one-year MA course at the School of Oriental and African Studies before studying for a PhD in Linguistics. Throughout this period, he was also responsible for continued administrative work for Wycliffe from his bedroom.

In January 1955, Bendor-Samuel became engaged to fellow Wycliffe member Pamela Moxham. After their first meeting at the SIL course in 1953, Moxham and Bendor-Samuel had remained friends, with her teaching him some phonetics, and him teaching her how to drive. Initially hesitant about marriage, the new certainty about his future had encouraged Bendor-Samuel to propose. The ceremony took place during that year's SIL course.

As Bendor-Samuel had chosen the Jebero language of Peru as the subject of his PhD, the newly married couple travelled to South America in 1955, where they would spend several years working with SIL International. After a year in Peru, collecting phonological and grammatical data on the language and helping to devise an alphabet, they returned to England, where John spent eighteen months working on his thesis. Following his thesis in 1958, he returned to South America with Pam, this time to Mato Grosso, Brazil to study the Terena language. During his years in Peru and Brazil, Bendor-Samuel continued to be involved in the annual SIL courses in England.

=== The beginning of work in Africa ===
Bendor-Samuel's first visit to Africa, where his most extensive and influential work occurred, was in 1960. In response to requests from various African church leaders, and following a particularly emotive plea from a Ghanaian language assistant who interrupted a Council meeting during the 1959 summer course, SIL president George Cowan decided that linguistic and Bible translation work should commence in Africa. Bendor-Samuel was chosen to conduct the initial survey work, and set off for Africa in June 1960. During this initial six-week journey, he visited language groups in Senegal, Portuguese Guinea, Sierra Leone, Liberia and Ghana.

This initial survey work convinced the Wycliffe International Conference about the idea of expanding their work into Africa, and Bendor-Samuel was chosen to direct this initiative. In November 1961, he returned to Africa on a more permanent basis. The Bendor-Samuels spent the next 20 years living in Africa, first in Ghana and then in Nigeria, but returning to the UK for three months each year to run the SIL training course.

A crucial part of Bendor-Samuel's work during his early years in Africa was making contact with key governmental and educational figures. The flourishing of the scholarly study of linguistics in Africa, with the emergence of new university departments, meant that he was able to forge working relationships with many African scholars. The first such agreement came in December 1961, with the Institute of African Studies at the University of Ghana, and a similar agreement was reached with the University of Nigeria soon afterwards.

When Wycliffe teams were forced to temporarily leave Nigeria due to the Nigerian Civil War in 1967, Bendor-Samuel used this as an opportunity to supervise the start of SIL work in other west African countries. Later that year, Bendor-Samuel reached an agreement with the University of Cameroon, allowing some workers to be re-allocated to that country with official support. An encounter with the Vice-Chancellor of the University of Abidjan, Côte d'Ivoire, allowed him to initiate linguistics work in that country as well. By 1969, SIL were also working in Togo. During the 1970s, Bendor-Samuel served as SIL's Africa Area Director. In this role, he was responsible for initiating and guiding SIL work further afield on the continent, in 13 further countries including Ethiopia, Sudan, Kenya, Burkina Faso, Senegal and the Central African Republic.

Bendor-Samuel later described the approach he took in exploring possibilities for expansion into new countries:

In going to a country for the first time, I would contact and gather information from all sorts of sources – Government officials, university staff and church leaders...I came away with a sketch of the language situation, the relationships between the languages, population details, the religious situation, language attitudes and other sociolinguistic factors which had a bearing on translation needs. Not a full-length portrait but a simple snapshot, sufficient for us to make initial plans which would need to be refined, corrected and expanded later. Besides setting up the basis for the work in a country, I used to visit our new teams twice a year...until there was a nucleus of members in the country and a new administration was in place.

As well as his supervisory role, Bendor-Samuel was himself involved in linguistic research in Africa, primarily into several Gur and Benue–Congo languages. He also founded the West Africa Linguistics Society in 1965, continuing to serve on their council until 1999 and editing their Journal of West African Languages (JWAL) between 1982 and 1993.

=== Leadership ===
From 1984, Bendor-Samuel held a number of important leadership positions, beginning with a seven-year term as Executive Vice-president of SIL International. This role necessitated a move to Dallas, Texas, making the 1983 SIL course the last one he directed. The position involved him speaking frequently at conferences, as well as visiting various SIL branches worldwide. Notably, he was invited to speak at the Second International Congress on World Evangelization in Manila in 1989.

In 1990 he was a co-founder of the Forum of Bible Agencies, which he established with Fergus MacDonald from the United Bible Societies in an attempt to promote greater cooperation among agencies working in Bible translation and distribution.

In 1992, he was elected Director of Wycliffe Bible Translators in the UK, but continued to be involved in the running of the Forum of Bible Agencies, as well as participating in several international conferences. During his term as Director, Bendor-Samuel introduced a number of initiatives, including a model for institutional funding for literacy and language development work; although this project did not have much of an impact in the UK, it was adopted successfully in other European countries. He also introduced a scheme called 'Vision 20', which connected churches in Britain with specific Bible translation projects that they could support. Later operating under the name 'In Focus', this programme continues to be an important part of Wycliffe UK's work. Later, Bendor-Samuel simultaneously served as the president of Wycliffe International. His terms in both of these roles concluded in 1999.

In 2000, he was appointed to the role of Wycliffe Africa Area director, to encourage African churches and organisations to support Bible translation in their countries and beyond.

For the final few years of his life, Bendor-Samuel was working in SIL's Africa archives, conducting research into the development of the organisation in that continent.

=== Death ===
Bendor-Samuel died in hospital following a car accident near his home in Studley Green on the evening of 6 January 2011. His wife Pamela Bendor-Samuel survived him by eight years (1930–2019). He is survived by their 5 children and 15 grandchildren.

== Influence and legacy ==
The executive director of SIL International, Freddy Boswell, asserted that "few people have impacted global language development and Bible translation over the last half century as did our beloved friend and colleague, Dr. John Bendor-Samuel".

The Forum of Bible Agencies International wrote "Few others saw with such clarity and felt with such passion the challenge to render the Word of God into the heart language of the world’s people groups."

John Bendor-Samuel had a particular impact in Africa, where his promotion of national organisations encouraged the establishment of several Wycliffe organisations across the continent. The Nigeria Bible Translation Trust emerged in 1976, and the Ghana Institute of Linguistics, Literacy and Bible Translation was founded three years later. Local translation organisations have also appeared. He also encouraged a number of African linguists, particularly through the West Africa Linguistic Society. He has vigorously encouraged and promoted the formation of national Bible translation organizations in African countries and has promoted partnerships between SIL International and governmental and non-governmental organizations, university departments, church and mission organizations. Bendor-Samuel's belief in the importance of training nationals in linguistic work was underscored by his experiences during the Nigerian Civil War, later writing:

"Although from the beginning we had tried to train West Africans, particularly Nigerians, it was the difficulties that we encountered with the civil war and then later in the year following it with getting visas that forced us to give much greater attention and priority to this aspect of our work".

== Publications ==
In total, Bendor-Samuel wrote one book, co-authored another, contributed several articles to academic journals and wrote 14 articles on Niger–Congo language groups for the Encyclopædia Britannica.

=== Books and monographs ===
==== As editor ====
- Ten Nigerian Tone Systems (Jos and Kano: Institute of Linguistics and Centre for the Study of Nigerian Languages, 1974)

==== As author ====
- The Verbal Piece in Jebero (New York: Linguistic Circle of New York, 1961)
- (with Paul E. and Ingeborg Meier) A Grammar of Izi, an Igbo Language (Norman: Summer Institute of Linguistics of the University of Oklahoma, 1975)
- (with Keir Hansford and Ronald Stanford) An Index of Nigerian Languages (Ghana: Summer Institute of Linguistics, 1976)
- John Bendor-Samuel, Rhonda Hartell, 1989, The Niger–Congo Languages: a classification and description of Africa's largest language family. University Press of America. ISBN 0-8191-7376-2, ISBN 978-0-8191-7376-8
- Encyclopædia Britannica articles on African languages: http://www.britannica.com/bps/user-profile/4338 Retrieved 24 Jan 2011
- John Bendor-Samuel bibliography at SIL International

=== Journal and book articles ===
- 'Some problems of segmentation in the phonological analysis of Tereno', WORD, 16 (1960)
- 'Stress in Terena', Transactions of the Philological Society (1963)
- 'A structure-function description of Terena phrases', Canadian Journal of Linguistics, 8 (1963)
- 'The Grusi sub-group of the Gur languages', Journal of West African Languages, 2 (1965)
- 'Problems in the analysis of sentences and clauses in Bimoba', WORD, 21 (1965)
- (with W.A.A. Wilson, Evangelina Arana and Morris Swadesh) 'A preliminary glottochronology of Gur languages', Journal of West African Languages, 3 (1966)
- (with Thomas Edmondson), 'Tone patterns of Etung', Journal of African Languages, 5 (1966)
- 'Some prosodic features in Terena' in C. E. Bazell (ed.), In memory of J. R. Firth (London: Longmans, 1966)
- 'Grammatical prosodies??' in Kenneth L. Pike (ed.), Tagmemic and matrix linguistics applied to selected African languages (Ann Arbor: University of Michigan, 1966)
- (with Ingeborg Meier) 'Some contrasting features of the Izi verbal system', Journal of African Languages, 6 (1967)
- 'Verb clusters in Izi', Journal of West African Languages, 5' (1968)
- (with W.A.A. Wilson) 'The phonology of the nominal in Dagbani', Linguistics, 52 (1969)
- (with Klaus W. Spreder) 'Fortis articulation: a feature of the present continuous verb in Agbo', Linguistics, 52 (1969)
- 'Yakur syllable patterns', WORD, 25 (1969)
- 'Syntagmatic features or grammatical prosodies' in Alexandru Graur et al. (eds.), Actes du Xe Congrès International des Linguistes (Bucharest: Académie de la République Socialiste de Roumani, 1970)
- (with Esther Cressman and Donna Skitch) 'The nominal phrase in Duka', Journal of West African Languages, 8 (1971)
- (with Mona Perrin), 'A note on labialisation in Mambila' in Actes du huitième Congrès International de Linguistique Africaine, Abidjan, 24-28 mars 1969 (Abidjan: Bibliothèque Universitaire, 1971)
- 'Niger–Congo: Gur' in Linguistics in sub-Saharan Africa (The Hague: Mouton, 1971)
- (with Esther Cressman and Donna Skitch) 'Duka sentence, clause and phrase' in Duka Sentence, Clause and Phrase (Zaria: Institute of Linguistics and Centre for the Study of Nigerian Languages, 1973)
- (with Robert Koops) 'The recapitulating pronouns in Kuteb', Journal of West African Languages, 9 (1974)
- (with Paul E. Meier) 'Izi' in John Bendor-Samuel (ed.), Ten Nigerian Tone Systems (Jos and Kano: Institute of Linguistics and Centre for the Study of Nigerian Languages, 1974)
- 'Propositions pour un modèle grammatical approprié aux travaux sur le terrain' in Les langues sans tradition écrite: Méthodes d’enquête et de description (Paris: Société d’Études Linguistiques et Anthropologiques de France, 1974)

=== Other ===
- The structure and function of the verbal piece in the Jebero language (PhD Thesis, University of London, 1958)
- 'Review of: Textos hixkaryâna, by Desmond C. Derbyshire', Lingua, 19 (1968)
- 'Review of: Languages of Guatemala, Marvin K. Mayers, editor', Lingua, 19 (1968)
- 'Review of: Description and classification of Siriono, a Tupi-Guaraní language, by Homer L. Firestone', Lingua, 19 (1968)

== Bibliography ==
- Thompson, Phyllis, Matched with His Hour (London: Word Books, 1974)
