= Forum of Bible Agencies International =

Christian alliance

- Formation: 1990
- Type: Not-for-profit
- Location: New York City
- Website: forum-intl.org

The Forum of Bible Agencies International is an alliance of more than 25 international Bible Agencies and other missions organizations which provides access to the Bible and encourages its use worldwide.

The Forum provides standards for Bible translation and opportunities for the collaboration of Bible Agencies in many countries.

The members of the Forum of Bible Agencies International work in more than 120 countries and are headquartered in five nations.

== Mission ==
The Forum of Bible Agencies International exists to promote collaboration and cooperation among Bible Agencies in order to provide access to the Bible and encourage its use worldwide. The Forum promotes and pursues collaboration by:

1. strengthening the relationships between the agencies
2. undertaking strategic global initiatives together
3. advocating for the centrality of the Bible in life and mission
4. fostering professional excellence of its members through training
5. providing support for the development of regional and national forums.

== History ==
At the 1989 Second International Congress on World Evangelization, workshops took place on the topic of Bible translation and distribution, which led to the formation of The Forum of Bible Agencies International the following year. The Forum was founded on the belief that collaboration and cooperation would significantly increase the speed and widen the scope for bringing about worldwide access to the Bible. The first annual meeting of the Forum was held in 1990 at Wycliffe Bible Translators' centre in Horsleys Green, England.

In 2001, the Forum of Bible Agencies International set out to create an Internet catalog of the world's Bibles. However, it wasn't until 2006 that the Forum was able to accomplish this goal and launched Find-a-Bible, a web directory providing links to Bibles and biblical resources in the 6000+ languages of the world. The Find-A-Bible directory primarily consists of content created by members of the Forum and contains links to print Bibles, print-on-demand Bibles, digital Bibles, audio Bibles, visual Bibles and Bible resources in multiple formats. In 2013, the Forum commissioned the Digital Bible Society to create and maintain a single location on the Internet where people looking for Bibles and biblical resources could obtain them.

In June 2002, at the Southern Baptist Convention, sponsors of the TNIV, in response to charges of inaccuracy about the translation from its critics, stated that their translation guidelines met the standards of the Forum of Bible Agencies International. Later that month, the Forum stated that it does not "approve, endorse, or support" any particular Bible translation.

The Forum gained incorporation status as a not-for-profit in May 2004.

In order to strive for professional excellence in the agencies who are involved in Bible translation and engagement, in October 2006, the Forum released two documents detailing translation standards in order to promote cooperation and collaboration among the agencies involved in the Forum. Members of the Forum of Bible Agencies International are also considering developing standards in other areas in the future, such as guidelines for collaborating in translation projects, collaboration with churches (providing best practices on engaging with churches locally, nationally and missionally in Bible translation), standards in audio and video presentations, and the place of storying and orality.

== Members ==
The Forum has two categories of membership: (a) full or voting members, or (b) associate or non-voting members. Some of the members have a long history of service (with the oldest being founded nearly 200 years ago), while other members are still very new.

=== Full members ===
To be a full member of the Forum, an organization must:

1. be primarily involved in the translation, publication, and/or distribution/engagement of the Bible
2. be a recognized not-for-profit entity
3. have an understanding and expressions of faith which fall within the mainstream of historic Christianity
4. maintain an international presence
5. devote a significant portion of its resources to translation, publication, and/or distribution/engagement work
6. agree with, and commit to abide by, the standards of the Forum as defined by the Forum Board.

Full members are:

- American Bible Society
- Bible League Canada
- Bible League International
- Biblica
- Davar Partners International
- Deaf Bible Society
- Deaf Missions
- DOOR International
- Faith Comes By Hearing
- Institute for Bible Translation
- Jesus Film Project
- Lifewords
- Lutheran Bible Translators
- OneHope
- Open Doors
- Pioneer Bible Translators
- Scripture Union
- Seed Company
- SIL International
- The Word for the World Bible Translators
- Wycliffe Bible Translators USA
- Wycliffe Global Alliance

=== Associate members ===
To be an associate/non-voting member of the Forum, an organization must satisfy one of the following descriptions:

1. Category A: Mission agencies with Bible ministries This category includes mission agencies or other entities who are involved in Bible translation, publication and/or distribution/engagement but not as one of their primary ministries. Such agencies must meet all the criteria for full members except points (a) and/or (e):
2. Category B: Autonomous entities of multiple-Bible agency organizations This category includes Bible Societies, Wycliffe national entities, and other autonomous entities of a Bible agency organization, which do not meet the criteria for full membership of the Forum.
3. Category C: Other Christian entities This category includes mission agencies or other entities that, in the opinion of the Board, would bring associate members, substantial strategic, and operational value to the Forum.

The associate members are:

- 4.2.20 Foundation
- Bibles for China
- Global Partners
- Global Recordings Network
- Crossway
- Digital Bible Society
- Ethnos360
- Jerusalem Center for Bible Translators
- Mars Hill Productions
- MegaVoice
- Mundo Cristão
- SIM International
- Spoken Worldwide
- Talking Bibles International
- Taylor University Center For Scripture Engagement
- Virtual Storehouse
- Wycliffe Bible Translators (UK & Ireland)
- YouVersion

=== Collaborating agency ===
- United Bible Societies

== Annual meetings ==
Annual Meetings for the Forum of Bible Agencies International are held once a year and are open to staff of member organizations and specially invited guests but only with prior agreement of a member organization's CEO, President, or Executive Director.

The 2015 Annual Meeting was held at Southwestern Baptist Theological Seminary in Fort Worth, Texas on April 20–22 with the theme "The Vulnerability of Translation".

The 2016 Annual Meeting will be held at the RIT Conference Center in Rochester, New York on April 10–13 with the theme "Deaf Communities: Today's Macedonian Call". This Annual Meeting is being organized by the Deaf Development Group and the keynote speaker will be Lance Forshay from the University of Washington.

== Regional and national forums ==
The Forum of Bible Agencies International is one expression of the broader and growing FOBA alliance. With the encouragement and efforts of international CEOs, regional forums emerged in the mid-1990s.

The Forum of Bible Agencies International serves as the “hub” for the global FOBA alliance and, as such, supports the development of regional and national forums. The Forum interacts and supports regional and national forums in many ways such as providing information on global FOBA developments, including international CEOs in local meetings and gatherings, engaging in joint ventures, launching local forums, and researching and providing the tools and know how for setting up and sustaining national partnerships.

=== Regional forums ===
Regional Forums are Bible agencies who collaborate within a specific region of the world and have meetings to determine the work that each organization will do within that region. These agencies come together to have the greatest impact that they can in that region by not stepping on one another's toes, but trusting that each organization will do their part in accomplishing the task of bringing the Bible to that region of the world.

==== Forum of Bible Agencies, Africa ====
- Bible League
- Campus Crusade for Christ International
- International Bible Society/Send The Light
- Language Recordings International
- Lifewords
- Scripture Union
- United Bible Societies
- Word For The World
- Wycliffe Global Alliance

==== Forum of Bible Agencies, Asia ====
- Bible League
- FEBA Radio
- Global Recordings Network
- Hosanna/Faith Comes By Hearing
- International Bible Society
- The JESUS Film Project
- Lifewords
- OneHope
- Trans World Radio
- United Bible Societies
- Wycliffe Global Alliance

==== Forum of Bible Agencies, Latin America ====
Meets once per year

- Bible League
- Hosanna/Faith Comes By Hearing
- International Bible Society/Send the Light
- Lifewords
- New Tribes Mission
- OneHope
- United Bible Societies
- World Bible Translation Center
- Wycliffe Global Alliance

==== Forum of Bible Agencies, North America ====
Meets once per year

- American Bible Society
- Back to the Bible
- Biblica
- Bible League Canada
- Bible League International
- Bible Literacy Project
- Canadian Bible Society
- Crossway
- DAVAR Partners International
- DOOR International (Deaf Opportunity Out Reach)
- Evangel Bible Translators
- The Evangelical Fellowship of Canada
- Every Home for Christ International
- Every Home for Christ
- Every Tribe Every Nation
- Faith Comes By Hearing
- FOBA-International
- Gideons International in Canada
- Institute for Bible Translation
- International Sharif Bible Society
- The Jesus Film Project
- MegaVoice International
- National Bible Association
- OneHope
- Open Doors Canada
- Open Doors International
- Open Doors USA
- Pocket Testament League
- Rhema for the Nations
- Scripture Gift Mission
- Scripture Union Canada
- Scripture Union USA
- The Seed Company
- The Word For The World USA
- Wycliffe Global Alliance
- Wycliffe Bible Translators of Canada
- YouVersion

==== Forum of Bible Agencies, Pacific ====
Meets once every two years

- Bible League New Zealand
- Bible Society Australia
- Bible Society of Papua New Guinea
- Bible Society of the South Pacific
- Bible Society New Zealand
- Global Recordings Network
- Lifewords
- Scripture Union
- Wycliffe Australia

=== National forums ===
National Forums are forums within specific countries of the world where the Bible agencies there have meetings to determine the work that each organization will do within that country. These agencies come together to have the greatest impact that they can in that country by not stepping on one another's toes, but trusting that each organization will do their part in accomplishing the task of bringing the Bible to that country.

- Forum of Bible Agencies, Australia
- Forum of Bible Agencies, Brazil
- Forum of Bible Agencies, Chad
- Forum of Bible Agencies, India
- Forum of Bible Agencies, Japan
- Forum of Bible Agencies, Kenya
- Forum of Bible Agencies, Malaysia
- Forum of Bible Agencies, Philippines
- Forum of Bible Agencies, Tanzania
- Forum of Bible Agencies, Uganda
