= Instituto Lingüístico de Verano =

Instituto Lingüístico de Verano, abbreviated ILV and the Spanish equivalent of Summer Institute of Linguistics, is the name of several non-profit organisations incorporated in Latin American countries, affiliated with the overarching parent organisation SIL International. As such, it may refer to:

- Instituto Lingüístico de Verano (Mexico), founded in Mexico in 1948 with the legal status of an Asociación Civil (civil association)
- Instituto Lingüístico de Verano (Peru), founded in Peru in 1946 as an asociación de voluntarios (voluntary association)
- SIL International, the parent organisation, based in the US and formerly known as the Summer Linguistics Institute, may by itself be referred to as the Instituto Lingüístico de Verano in general Spanish
