= Pioneer Bible Translators =

Christian organization

Coordinates: 32°40′0″N 96°57′4.5″W

- Abbreviation: PBT
- Formation: 1976; 50 years ago
- Founder: Al Hamilton
- Type: Non-profit
- Headquarters: Dallas, Texas
- President: Greg Pruett
- Board Chairman: Dave Butts
- Website: www.pioneerbible.org

Pioneer Bible Translators is a non-profit, 501(c)(3) mission organization focused on Bible translation in languages that do not already have a Bible.

== History ==
Pioneer Bible Translators has its roots in the Restoration Movement. The organization was initially influenced by Cameron Townsend of Wycliffe Bible Translators, Donald McGavran of the Church Growth movement, and Eugene Nida of the United Bible Societies. It incorporated in 1976 in Dallas, Texas.

Pioneer Bible Translators has recently had two of its missionaries serve as president of the International Conference On Missions. Greg Pruett, missionary and Bible translator with the Yalunka people in West Africa, and Pioneer Bible Translators current president, served in 2003. Marsha Relyea Miles, missionary and Bible translator in Papua New Guinea, served in 2007.

In 2012, Pioneer Bible Translators and Johnson University formed an educational partnership to educate new recruits of Pioneer Bible Translators as they prepare to go to the field.

In 2016, The Jesus Film Project completed its 1,400th translation of the film. Pioneer Bible Translators has contributed to many of the films to help make the film understandable by various cultures. Pioneer Bible Translators has also been assisting in the development and implementation of Render, to allow the translation of the Bible into oral and aural cultures.

Former United States Supreme Court nominee Harriet Miers previously served on the Pioneer Bible Translators board.

== Work ==
As of 2016, Pioneer Bible Translators is serving 43 million people in 92 language projects in 18 countries, and has between 400 and 500 personnel serving in the United States and around the world.

A 2013 report by Forbes noted that Bible translation made up 79% of Pioneer's expenses, compared to only 10% for Wycliffe Bible Translators .
