= ILV =

ILV may refer to:

- Instituto Lingüístico de Verano (Mexico), affiliate organisation of SIL International (Summer Institute of Linguistics), based in Mexico
- Instituto Lingüístico de Verano (Peru), affiliate organisation of SIL International (Summer Institute of Linguistics), based in Peru
