= Wycliffe Bible Translators (UK & Ireland) =

- Named after: John Wycliffe
- Formation: 1953
- Type: Christian charity
- Purpose: Bible translation
- Region served: Worldwide
- Website: wycliffe.org.uk

Wycliffe Bible Translators is a Christian mission agency with a primary focus on Bible translation for people worldwide. It is the UK's largest Bible translation organisation. It is part of the Wycliffe Global Alliance.

== History ==
Wycliffe Bible Translators was founded by other British mission agencies, who were initially seeking improved linguistic training for their own missionaries. They formed a sponsoring committee and invited the Summer Institute of Linguistics to hold an 11-week training course in the UK in 1953. Fourteen people attended the first Wycliffe Language Course that summer, held at London Bible College.

Following the course, it was agreed that Wycliffe Bible Translators should be created as a specialist mission agency, following the model set by Wycliffe Bible Translators USA which had been founded 11 years earlier. Pam Moxham (later Bendor-Samuel) was the first to join, in 1953. The first secretary was John Bendor-Samuel, whose "attic bedroom became the central office of Wycliffe in England, complete with a ream of headed notepaper, a box of envelopes, a cash book, an old filing cabinet donated by a friend, and not much else." Initially those joining Wycliffe became members of Wycliffe USA, but in 1957 it was agreed that Wycliffe should be responsible for the work in the UK and Ireland.

The focus of the early members was in Latin America. Working with unwritten languages at a time when descriptive linguistics was still relatively new, they made substantial contributions to the developing field of linguistics.

== Current activities ==
Approximately 90% of Wycliffe's members are assigned to work with international partners. Some of these are working in Bible translation, others in literacy, training, Scripture use, language development or in providing services that support translation and Scripture access. Others are involved in leadership, advocacy and supporting the activities of Wycliffe, both globally and at a local level.

Wycliffe is a member of Evangelical Alliance, Global Connections, Wycliffe Global Alliance, and the Forum of Bible Agencies International.

== See also ==
- Bible translations
- Bible translations by language
- Wycliffe Global Alliance
