= Steve Russell (politician) =

American politician & soldier (born 1963)

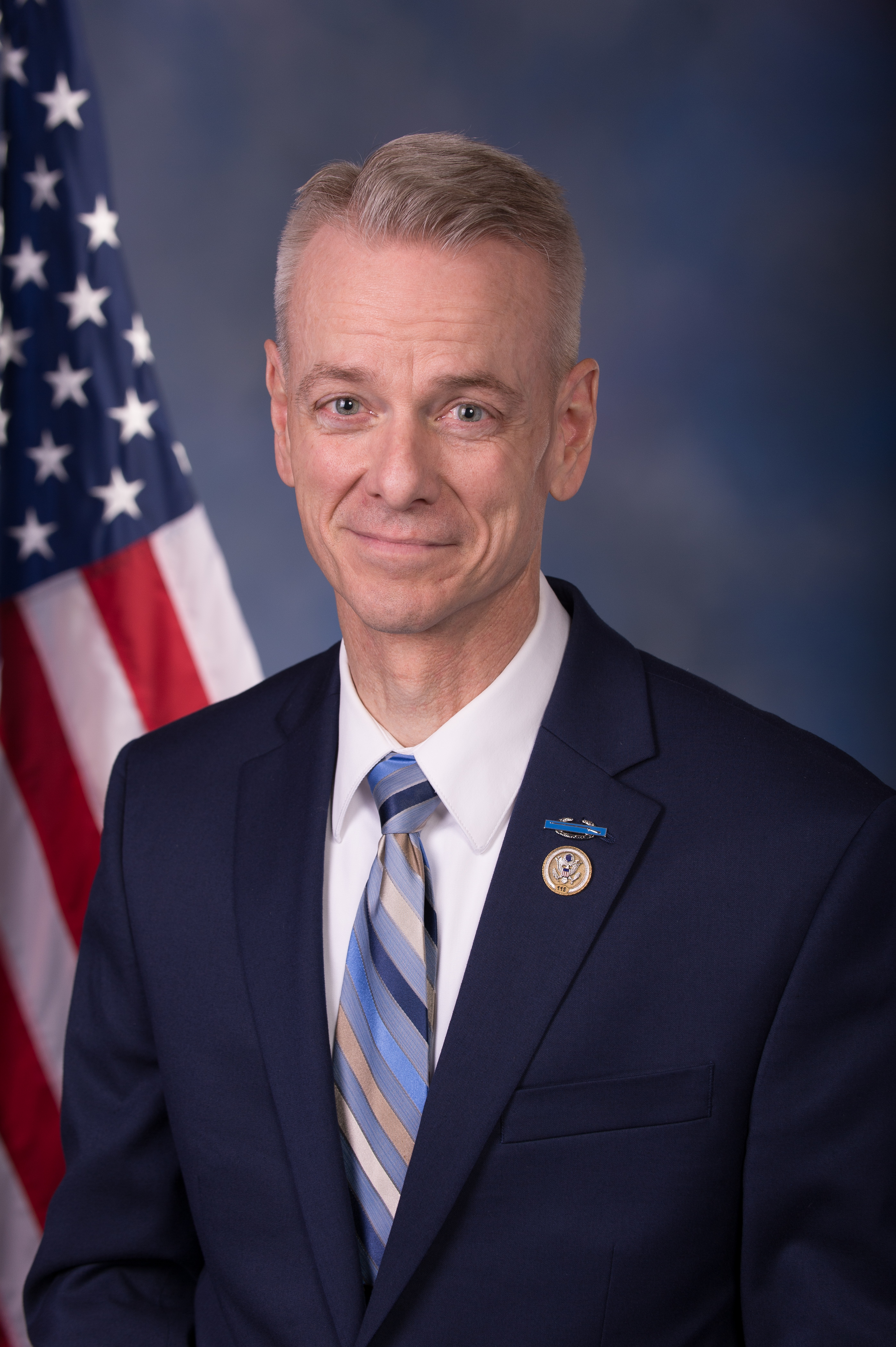
- Official portrait, 2017

Member of the U.S. House of Representatives from Oklahoma's 5th district
- In office January 3, 2015 – January 3, 2019
- Preceded by: James Lankford
- Succeeded by: Kendra Horn

Member of the Oklahoma Senate from the 45th district
- In office January 3, 2009 – January 8, 2013
- Preceded by: Kathleen Wilcoxson
- Succeeded by: Kyle Loveless

Personal details
- Born: Steven Dane Russell; May 25, 1963 (age 63) Oklahoma City, Oklahoma, U.S.
- Party: Republican
- Spouse: Cindy Myers (m. 1985)
- Children: 5
- Education: Ouachita Baptist University (BA); United States Army Command and General Staff College (MMAS)

Military service
- Branch/service: United States Army
- Years of service: 1985–2006
- Rank: Lieutenant colonel
- Unit: 1st Battalion, 22nd Infantry Regiment; 4th Infantry Division; 1st Battalion, 26th Infantry Regiment; 1st Infantry Division
- Battles/wars: Kosovo War; Afghanistan War; Iraq War • Operation Red Dawn
- Awards: Legion of Merit; Bronze Star (with valor); Combat Infantryman Badge; Ranger tab

Steven Dane Russell (born May 25, 1963) is president and CEO of JAARS, Inc. He is a retired American soldier and former politician. He served in the United States House of Representatives for Oklahoma's 5th congressional district from 2015 to 2019, after serving in the Oklahoma Senate from 2009 to 2013. Russell is a member of the Republican Party.

Russell reached the rank of lieutenant colonel in the United States Army, and played a significant role in the capture of Saddam Hussein during the Iraq War. He served in the Oklahoma Senate, and ran for the House of Representatives when James Lankford did not run for reelection. After winning two terms in the House, Russell was defeated for re-election in 2018 by Democrat Kendra Horn. After serving as Executive Pastor of First Southern Baptist Church of Oklahoma City, Oklahoma from 2019 to 2022, he assumed the position of president and CEO of JAARS, Inc. on October 1, 2022.

== Early life ==
Russell was born on May 25, 1963, in Oklahoma City, Oklahoma, to Clyde E. "Gene" Russell and Donna J. Porter Russell. Russell grew up in Del City, Oklahoma. The youngest of three, Russell nearly died at birth due to an opposite blood type with his mother.

Russell attended school at Del City Elementary and Kerr Junior High. He became a Christian reading a Gideon's New Testament he picked up at Kerr in 1977. In 1980, Russell was an exchange student to Germany, living in Kasseedorf near Eutin in Schleswig-Holstein. Graduating from Del City High School in 1981, Russell was President of his senior class and voted most likely to succeed. After earning a four-year Army ROTC scholarship, Russell attended Ouachita Baptist University in Arkadelphia, Arkansas. After graduating with a degree in Public Speaking, Russell was commissioned a second lieutenant in the U.S. Army infantry.

== Military career ==
Receiving his Infantry training at Fort Benning, Georgia, Russell married Cindy Myers, whom he met at Ouachita, on December 21, 1985. Russell would graduate from the U.S. Army Infantry Officers' Basic Course, Airborne School, Mortar School and a year later from the U.S. Army Ranger School in Class 11–87.

Russell served 21 years in airborne, light and mechanized assignments in the Arctic, the desert, the Pacific, in Europe and in the Continental United States. He served more than seven years overseas and deployed operationally to Kosovo, Kuwait, Afghanistan and Iraq.

During Operation Iraqi Freedom, Russell commanded the 1st Battalion, 22nd Infantry 'Regulars' and conducted combat in Tikrit, Iraq from the spring of 2003 to the spring of 2004. His task force was a part of Colonel James Hickey's 1st Brigade, 4th Infantry Division. Russell's battalion was broadly covered during the first year of the war by CNN, Fox News Channel, ABC, NBC, CBS, TIME, Associated Press and Reuters. His unit was a central player in the hunt and capture of Saddam Hussein and has been featured in the Discovery Channel's Ace in the Hole and BBC Panorama's 'Saddam on the Run' documentaries. Russell has also been featured in a documentary highlighting his military life and political transition in the American Patriots Unsung series called 'Sacred Honor.' Russell was also featured in To War with the Fourth, a documentary book covering the history of the U.S. Army's Fourth Infantry Division from World War I to the Global War on Terror.

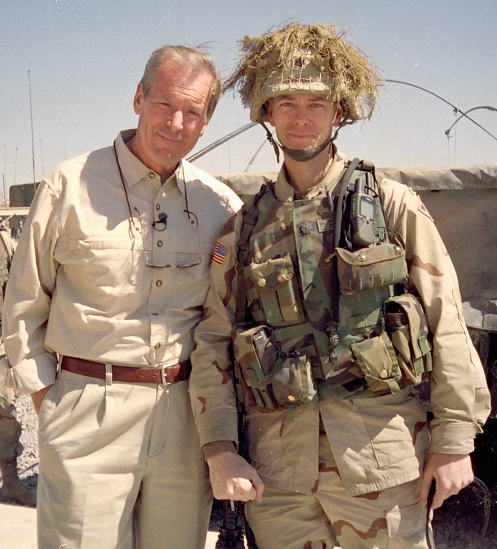
Russell with Peter Jennings in Tikrit, Iraq in March 2004

Russell is highly decorated, having received the Legion of Merit, the Bronze Star Medal with Valor Device and Oak Leaf Cluster, the Combat Infantryman's Badge and his unit in Iraq was awarded the Valorous Unit Award for its role in the hunt and capture of Saddam Hussein.

Russell continued in command of the 1st Battalion, 22nd Infantry until June, 2005, when he was selected to become the Chief of Tactics at the US Army Infantry School at Ft. Benning, GA. Turning down a Queen's University Fellowship to Kingston, Canada for the U.S. Army War College and promotion to colonel, Russell retired as a lieutenant colonel in 2006. He returned to Oklahoma with his wife and five children.

== Post-military career ==
Russell began an active veterans advocacy career upon retirement and worked closely with other veterans to bolster the soldiers voice in the wars in Iraq and Afghanistan. He formed Vets for Victory with several decorated warriors holding rallies in several states to embolden the public to support the troops. Russell also toured the country with many distinguished and highly decorated veterans such as David Bellavia, author of House to House; Marcus Luttrell, author of Lone Survivor; Jeremiah Workman, author of Shadow of the Sword; and Sean Parnell, author of Outlaw Platoon.

As a motivational speaker, Russell embarked on a successful speaking career in hundreds of cities since 2007. He has been featured as a keynote speaker at such notable events as the Ring Banquet at the U.S. Air Force Academy and was honored as the Paul R. Smith Award recipient for his distinguished service in Iraq at the American Veterans Center 15th Annual Awards Gala in 2012. He is managed by Premiere Speakers Bureau of Franklin, Tennessee.

Display of Russell's book We Got Him! published by Simon & Schuster

Russell has also been a successful writer and author. His opinion pieces have appeared in many major publications, and he is the author of We Got Him!: A Memoir of the Hunt and Capture of Saddam Hussein, published by Simon & Schuster in December 2011. An earlier version of the work was published by Deeds Publishing that year. The book has received critical acclaim for its vivid portrayal of combat and the events surrounding the hunt for the Iraqi dictator and his capture. It received numerous endorsements to include General Tommy Franks and the foreword was written by General Ray Odierno.

Russell also has appeared on many national television and radio shows as a military and foreign affairs commentator. In addition, he has made appearances on Spike TV's Deadliest Warrior and four episodes of Outdoor Channel's Gun Stories.

Russell is also the founder of Two Rivers Arms, a small rifle manufacturing business that makes copies of the Iraqi Tabuk AK-47 and Iraqi Tabuk Sniper Rifle. The company built half a dozen special Iraqi rifle replicas for Clint Eastwood's film American Sniper.

== Oklahoma State Senator ==
Russell began his service to the public in 2008 when he defeated four opponents in one of the most contested races in the Oklahoma State Senate that year. Russell received the most votes but did not win the initial Republican primary with 42% of the vote, leading by 15 points. He won the Republican run off with 67% of the vote.

As a state senator Russell authored the Soldiers Relief Act that made Oklahoma's serving military tax exempt, affecting over 50,000 soldiers and their families. He also authored the Soldiers Credentialing Act, a law allowing credit for soldiers skills through direct certification rather than additional schooling allowing them to quickly enter the work force. Additionally, Russell authored a number of bills that became law related to the 2nd Amendment. Shortly after the publication of his book, Russell announced he would not seek reelection and he decided to focus on his business, public speaking and veterans advocacy.

== United States Representative ==
In January 2014, Russell announced he would seek the seat of the United States House of Representatives in Oklahoma's 5th congressional district, which was being vacated by James Lankford in his US Senate bid. On June 24, 2014, Russell led the field in the six-way Republican Primary but did not garner enough votes to receive the nomination. On Tuesday, August 26, 2014, Russell won the run-off election. On November 4, 2014, Russell was elected to Congress with 60.1% of the vote, defeating Democratic State Senator Al McCaffrey and three minor Independent candidates, Buddy Ray, Tom Boggs and Robert Murphy.

On June 28, 2016, Russell won the Republican Primary in his bid for re-election to Congress with more than 80% of the vote, defeating Frank Volpe. On November 8, 2016, Russell was elected to a second term in Congress.

Russell was listed as one of the most effective lawmakers in Congress during his tenure by the Center for Effective Lawmaking. He ranked twenty-two among 245 Republicans and was in the top six in his elected class.

Russell was the lead Republican sponsor with Democratic Congressman Matt Cartwright, of H.R. 4904 - The MEGABYTE Act of 2016, which became law on July 29, 2016, during the 114th Congress, 2nd Session (2016). This bill requires the Office of Management and Budget (OMB) to issue a directive to require the Chief Information Officer (CIO) of each executive agency to develop a comprehensive software licensing policy that also allows governmental transfer of software licenses between agencies for a more cost-effective system. The bill has saved an estimated $120 Million a year every year since it was signed into law.

Russell was the main sponsor of H.R. 5785, An Act to Provide for an Annuity Supplement for Certain Air Traffic Controllers, which became law on December 8, 2016, during the 114th Congress, 2nd Session (2016). This bill exempts retired air traffic controllers from a reduction to their Federal Employees Retirement System annuity supplement (on account of their earnings for work performed while entitled to the annuity after their separation from federal service) during any period in which they are employed full time as air traffic control instructors under contract with the Federal Aviation Administration.

Russell was instrumental in reforming the 1982 Uniformed Spousal Protection Act of 1982. Russell's amendment to the National Defense Authorization would end the windfall in future divorce cases by directing that an ex-spouse's share of military retirement must be based on a member's grade or rank at time of divorce. The amendment won broad bi-partisan support and was signed into law on December 23, 2016.

Russell was the main sponsor of H.R. 194, Federal Agency Mail Management Act of 2017, which became law on November 21, 2017, during the 115th Congress, 1st Session (2017). This bill would require the General Services Administration (GSA) to provide guidance and assistance to federal agencies for effective mail processing, leading to a more efficient, cost-saving system.

Russell's bill H.R. 195, Continuing Appropriations for the Fiscal Year ending September 30, 2018, became law on January 22, 2018. Originally a bill to reform printing costs in publication of the Federal Register, it was expanded to provide the vehicle to end the government shutdown that year.

Russell was instrumental in blocking the privatization of air traffic control. Russell's criticism of privatization extended to national security concerns as well as keeping the national airspace open to all Americans. The Federal Aviation Administration's Mike Monroney Aeronautical Center is in Oklahoma City. Russell, along with Congressman Ralph Abraham, was recognized by several national aviation organizations for their efforts and received the 2018 Hartranft Award presented by the Aircraft Owners and Pilots Association.

Russell was the main sponsor of H.R. 6893, The Secret Service Overtime Pay Extension Act, which became law on December 21, 2018, during the 115th Congress, 2nd Session (2018). This bill extends the exemption of U.S. Secret Service officers, employees, and agents who perform protective services from the limitation on premium pay otherwise applicable to federal employees.

On June 26, 2018, Russell was nominated as Republican candidate for a third term with nearly 84% of the vote. However, Russell lost to Democratic opponent Kendra Horn on November 6, 2018. Nearly every rating organization labeled Russell as the favorite due to him being the incumbent in a district that had not elected a Democrat in over forty years, and FiveThirtyEight gave Russell a 93 percent chance of victory. Ultimately, Russell could not overcome a 9,900-vote deficit in Oklahoma County, home to three–fourths of the district's population–more than three times the overall margin of 3,300 votes. His loss to Horn was a major upset and was an example of sweeping Republican losses in the House leading to a Democratic majority. It also highlighted the growing role of urban voters in typically conservative states.

== Committee assignments ==
- Committee on Armed Services
- Committee on Oversight and Government Reform—served as Vice Chair of Committee
  - United States House Oversight Subcommittee on National Security—served as Chair of Subcommittee
- House Republican Steering Committee

== Post-political life ==
Russell returned to public speaking on leadership, decision-making and the hunt and capture of Saddam with Premiere Speakers Bureau. He also became the Executive Pastor of First Southern Baptist Church in Oklahoma City. Russell also founded a non-profit mission aviation organization called 'The Redeemed Flying Corps' and served as its first executive director. In October 2022, Russell became the president and CEO of JAARS, Inc., a mission aviation and support organization founded in 1948 by William Cameron Townsend.

== Personal life ==
Russell is a fifth-generation Oklahoman. His hobbies include teaching Sunday school, reading and studying history, playing the guitar and singing, as well as collecting military antiques and firearms. Russell is also a licensed pilot. Russell has been married to the former Cindy Myers of Columbus, Arkansas, since 1985. They have five grown children, three of whom were adopted from Hungary. They are members of First Southern Baptist Church in Oklahoma City, Oklahoma, where he served as the Executive Pastor.

== Education ==
Russell is a graduate of Del City High, Class of 1981. He was inducted into the Del City Hall of Fame in its very first class along with professional football player Bob Kalsu who was killed in Vietnam and two-time Olympic Gold Medalist John Smith.

Russell graduated from Ouachita Baptist University with a BA in Public Speaking. He was the president and pledge master of his fraternity and cadet corps commander of the ROTC Cadets.

Russell also earned a MMAS in Military History with a focus on East Asia from the Command and General Staff College at Fort Leavenworth, Kansas, in 1998. His other military education includes the Infantry Officers Basic Course, the Armored Officers Career Course, the Combined Arms Staff School and the Battalion Commanders Course.

Russell's military skills schools include, Airborne School, Ranger School, Northern Warfare Summer and Winter Phase, Mortar School, and the Bradley Gunners and Commanders Courses.

Awards, Decorations and Badges of Steve Russell

== Military awards and decorations ==
Russell has been decorated for campaign service, meritorious achievement, and valor. His decorations include the Legion of Merit, the Bronze Star Medal for valor and service, the Meritorious Service Medal (six awards), the Joint Service Commendation Medal, the Army Commendation Medal (three awards), the Army Achievement Medal (four awards), the National Defense Service Medal (two awards), the Armed Forces Expeditionary Medal, the Kosovo Campaign Medal, the Afghanistan Campaign Medal, the Iraq Campaign Medal, the Global War on Terrorism Expeditionary Medal, the Global War on Terrorism Service Medal, the Military Outstanding Volunteer Service Medal, the NATO Medal for Kosovo, and Russell is a member of the Military Order of the Loyal Legion of the United States. He was awarded the Ranger Tab, the Combat Infantryman Badge and the US Army and Korean Parachutists Badge.

== Electoral history ==
Year	Office	District	Democratic		Republican		Other	
2014	U.S. House of Representatives	Oklahoma's 5th district	Al McAffrey	36.32%	Steve Russell	60.1%	Robert T. Murphy (Ind.)	1.4%
2016	U.S. House of Representatives	Oklahoma's 5th district	Al McAffrey	36.8%	Steve Russell	57.1%	Zachary Knight (L)	6.1%
2018	U.S. House of Representatives	Oklahoma's 5th district	Kendra Horn	50.7%	Steve Russell	49.3%		

U.S. House of Representatives
Preceded by James Lankford	Member of the U.S. House of Representatives from Oklahoma's 5th congressional district 2015–2019	Succeeded by Kendra Horn
U.S. order of precedence (ceremonial)
Preceded by Jim Bridenstine as Former U.S. Representative	Order of precedence of the United States as Former U.S. Representative	Succeeded by Gabrielle Giffords as Former U.S. Representative
