= Bob Hoskins (disambiguation) =

Bob Hoskins (1942–2014) was an English actor and film director

Bob Hoskins may also refer to:

- Bob Hoskins (American football) (1945–1980), American football player
- Bob Hoskins (missionary) (1936–2026), American Christian missionary
