= Wycliffe USA =

American Christian organization

- Formation: 1942
- Founder: William Cameron Townsend
- Type: Nonprofit organization
- Legal status: 501(c)(3) charitable organization
- Headquarters: Orlando, Florida, U.S.
- Region served: Worldwide
- Official language: English
- President/CEO: John Chesnut
- Main organ: Board of Directors
- Affiliations: Wycliffe Global Alliance, SIL International
- Website: wycliffe.org

Wycliffe Bible Translators USA (also known as Wycliffe USA) is an American interdenominational Christian nonprofit organization with a goal "for people from every language to understand the Bible and be transformed."

Based in Orlando, Florida, it partners with many organizations and churches around the world to help facilitate the work of Bible translation. It is the largest of the many independent organizations that together are part of Wycliffe Global Alliance.

== History ==
Wycliffe USA was founded in 1942 by William Cameron Townsend, and is named after John Wycliffe who was responsible for the first complete English translation of the whole Bible into Middle English.

It led to the founding of many similar organisations around the world, with separate Wycliffe organizations in over 60 countries within the Wycliffe Global Alliance.

As of September 2023, translations of either portions of the Bible, the New Testament, or the whole Bible exist in over 3,658 of the 7,394 languages used on Earth. Wycliffe has translated the Bible into more than 700 languages.

== Methodology ==
Wycliffe describes its mission as being to "Serve with the global body of Christ to advance Bible translation and work together so people can encounter God through his Word".

Wycliffe missionaries develop alphabets, help preliterate people learn to read and write, and translate the Bible into written versions of currently spoken languages. By developing written languages, the organization is helping to "save lost and dying languages."

Due to technological advances, Wycliffe's missionaries in the United States connect with translation teams in other areas of the world to translate the Bible into additional languages. As a result, translations that used to take 20 or 30 years to finish can be completed in six or seven years in some cases.

Wycliffe has also joined with the Deaf Bible Society and other organizations to translate the Bible into sign languages.

== Associated organizations ==
SIL International, originally the Summer Institute of Linguistics, began as a small summer training session for missionaries in Arkansas in 1934. It is a partner organization of the Wycliffe Global Alliance and Wycliffe USA.

A partner organization of SIL International, JAARS, originally the Jungle Aviation And Radio Service, based out of Waxhaw, North Carolina, provides transportation and technical support for SIL in support of Bible translation across the globe.

The Seed Company is a subsidiary of Wycliffe USA that provides support to people doing Bible translations for their own languages.

== See also ==
- Bible translations by language
- Wycliffe Bible Translators (UK & Ireland)
- Wycliffe Global Alliance
