= JAARS =

Christian organization

JAARS, Inc.
- Founded: 1948 as Jungle Aviation and Radio Service
- Founder: William Cameron Townsend
- Type: Non-profit
- Headquarters: Waxhaw, North Carolina
- Location: 7405 Jaars Road, Waxhaw, North Carolina, USA
- Coordinates: 34°51′53″N 80°44′31″W
- Region served: Worldwide
- President and CEO: Steve Russell
- Revenue: > US$9,830,256
- Website: jaars.org

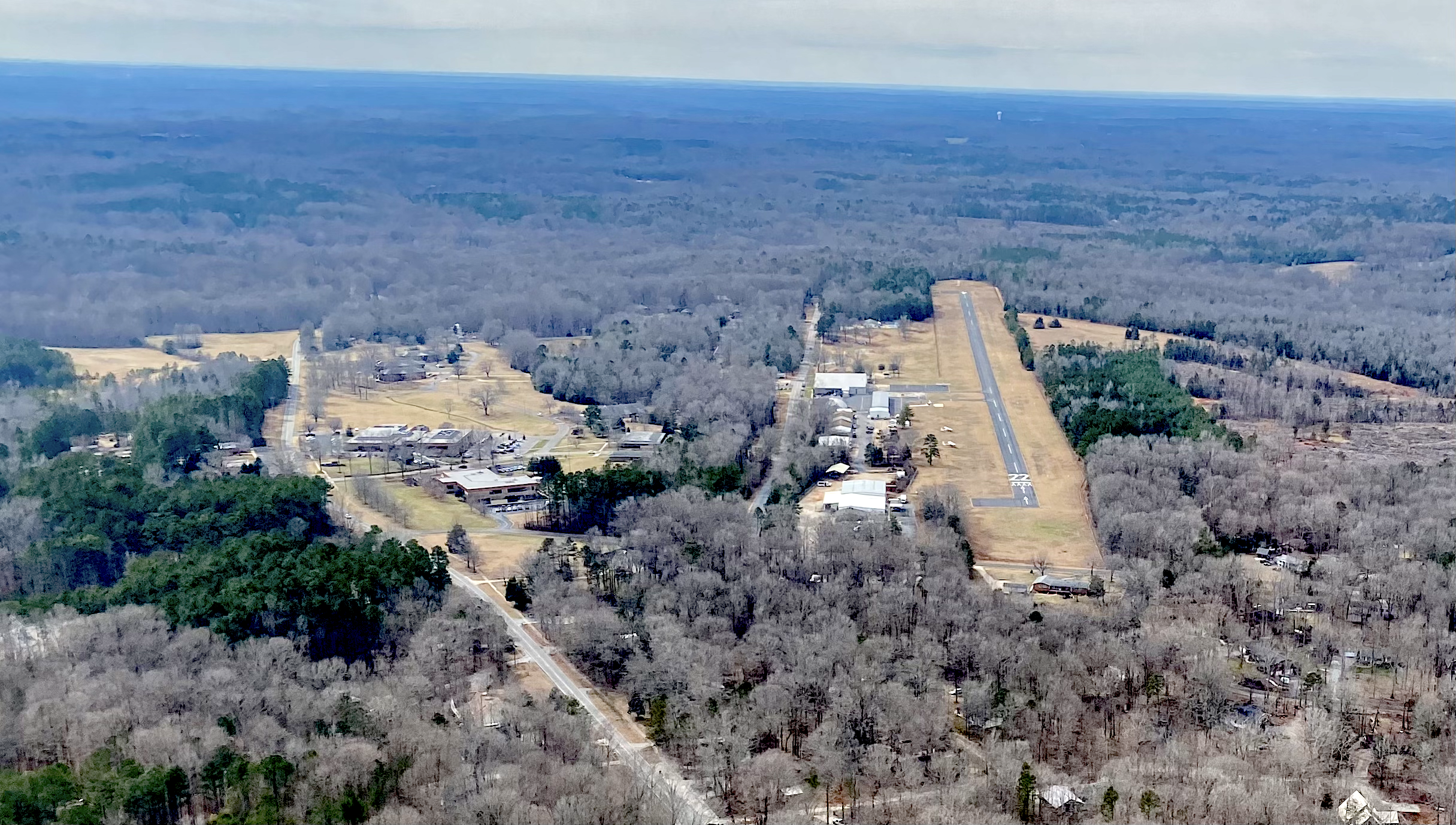
JAARS Base and Townsend Field (N52), Waxhaw, North Carolina

JAARS (Jungle Aviation and Relay Service) is a non-profit Christian mission aviation organization with a primary focus on support operations for Bible translation. JAARS collaborates with a number of trusted mission organizations—including Wycliffe Bible Translators, the Seed Company, and many of the mission organizations that comprise the Wycliffe Global Alliance—who face geographical barriers that make it difficult to reach and work with remote people groups that do not yet have the Bible in their own languages.

JAARS focuses its operations on the worldwide “green band” of rainforest regions. This geographical area sits just north and south of the equator and stretches from east to west around the globe, encapsulating rainforest regions in South America, Africa, and the South Pacific. The green band includes regions with mountainous terrain, wide expanses of open ocean, treacherous rivers, few roads and little public transportation or communications infrastructure. Using special-purpose aircraft, boats and off-road vehicles, JAARS enables partners to overcome these barriers.

Steve Russell is president and CEO of JAARS.

== History ==
William Cameron Townsend co-founded Wycliffe Bible Translators and the Summer Institute of Linguistics (SIL) in 1934. As the Bible translation work of these organizations grew in a number of remote rainforest regions in Latin America, Townsend recognized the need for float-plane transport to provide safe access to language groups in those areas. He also determined that Bible translators and language workers in the field needed short-wave radio service to communicate with their home base. He founded Jungle Aviation and Radio Service (JAARS) in 1948 to provide those support services in Latin America.

In 1961, after many years of service in Latin America, JAARS moved its headquarters to its current location in Waxhaw, North Carolina. The 630 acres of land where JAARS is located began as a 200-acre donation by the Belk family.

In 1986, as a result of diversifying activities, JAARS officially dropped the original meaning behind the acronym and became simply JAARS. In 2023 JAARS marked its 75th anniversary with a slight adjustment to its name to incorporate its 75-year heritage: Jungle Aviation and Relay Service.

== Operations and activities ==
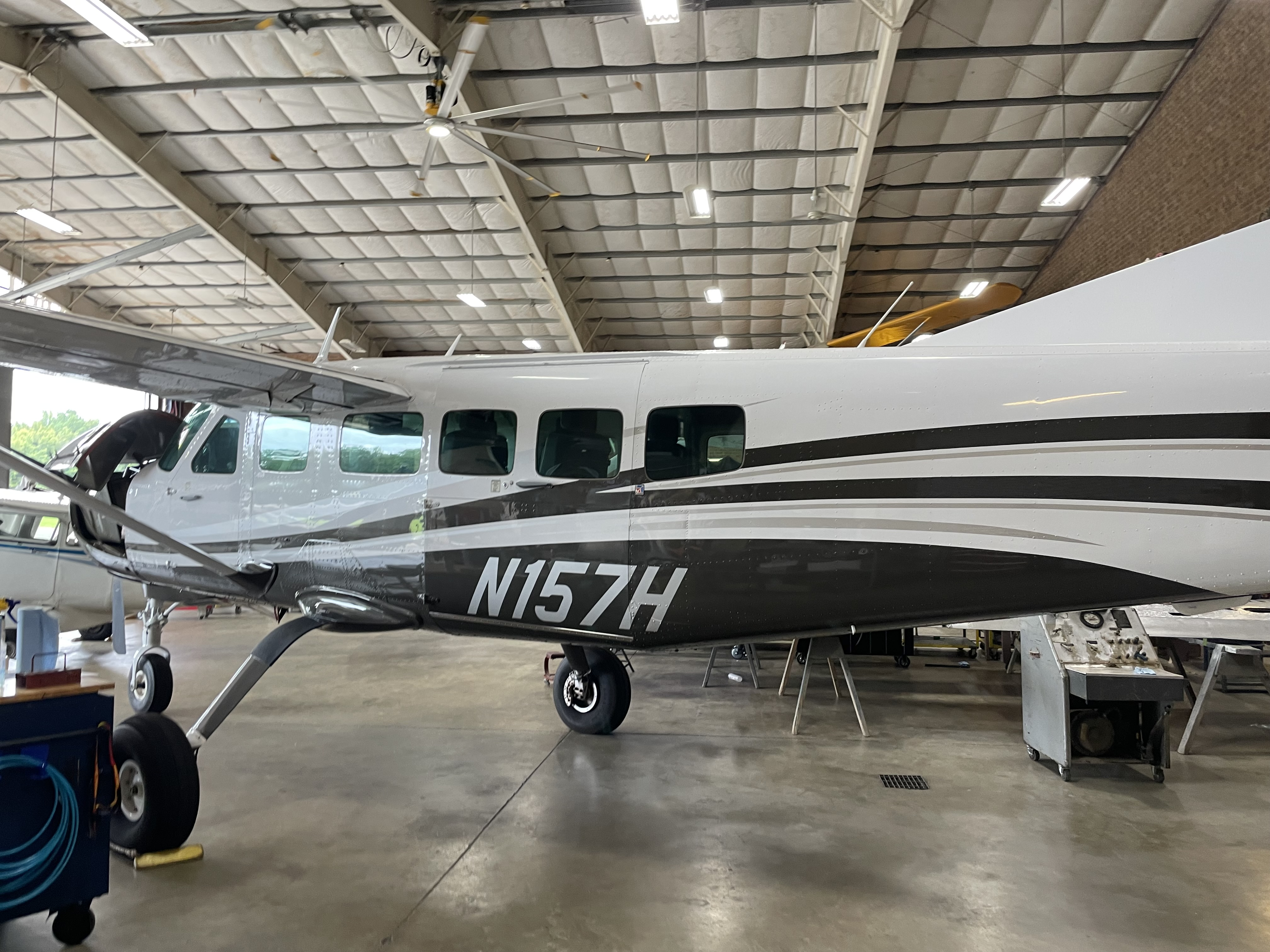
Cessna Caravan 208 undergoing maintenance at the JAARS Center

=== JAARS Base ===
The JAARS North Carolina headquarters, also called the JAARS Base, is operated by over 400 people on 630 acres, encompassing 68 buildings. The JAARS Base serves as the home for the organization's core operations.

The JAARS airport is registered with the FAA as JAARS-Townsend Airport (FAA LID: N52), a public-use airport. The public-use runway is 3,309' x 40' listed as good asphalt. Additionally, JAARS uses three grass runways for standards training.

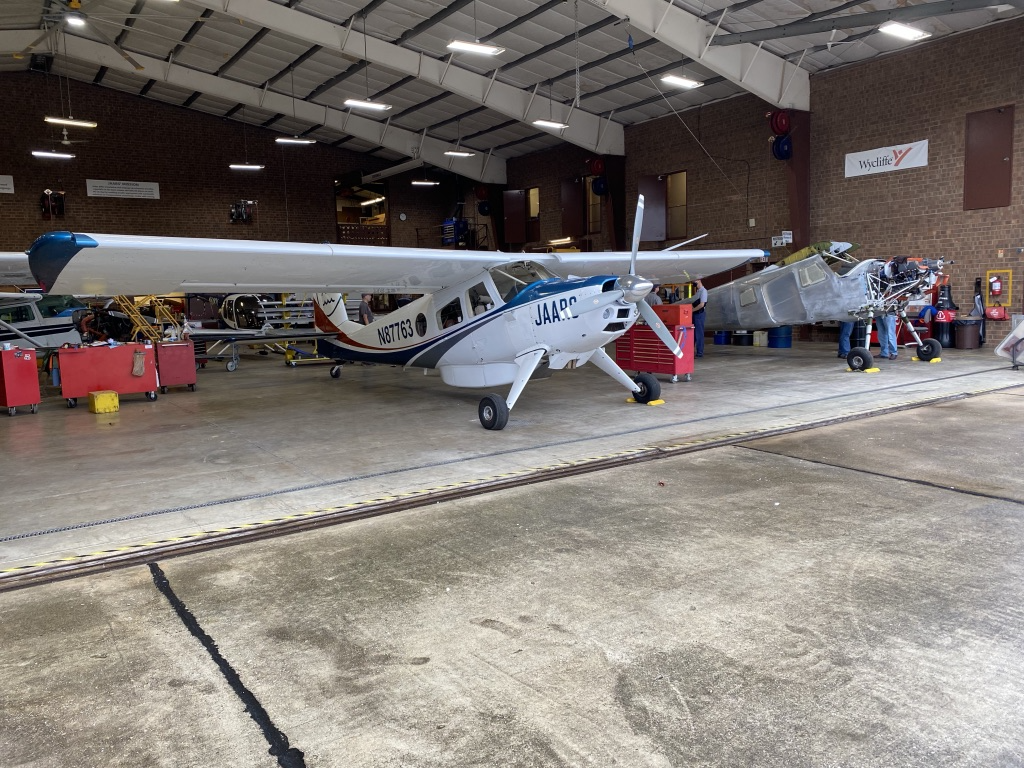
Helio Couriers at Townsend Field at the JAARS Center.

=== Aviation ===
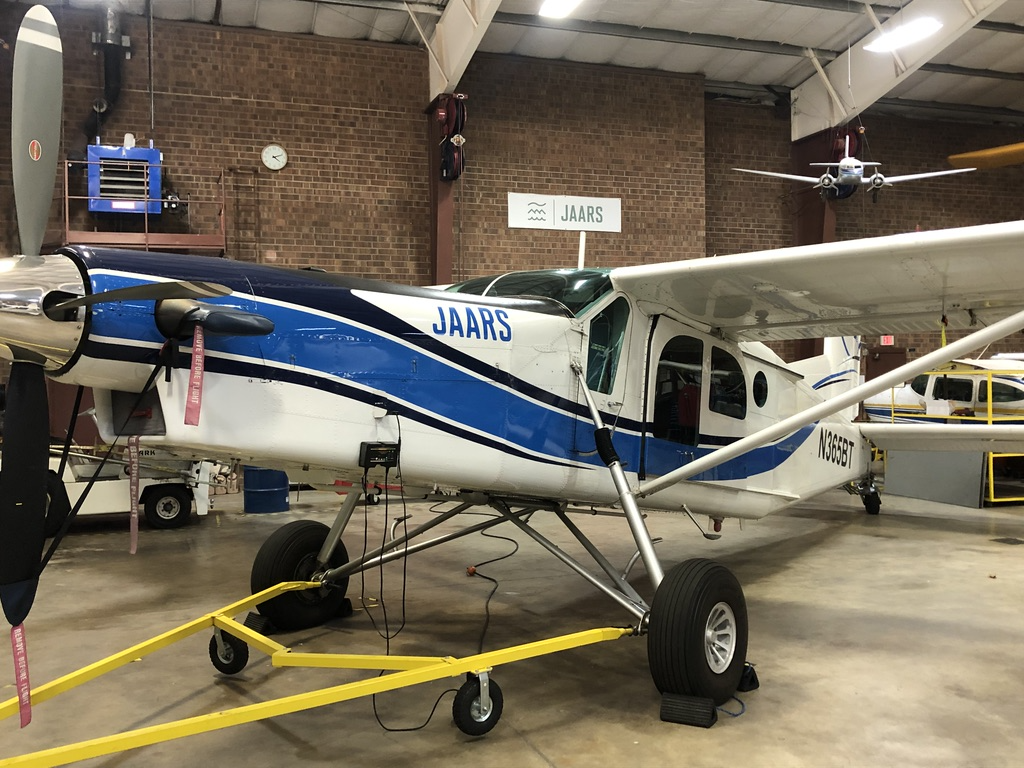
Pilatus PC-6 Porter at Townsend Field, JAARS Base, Waxhaw, North Carolina.

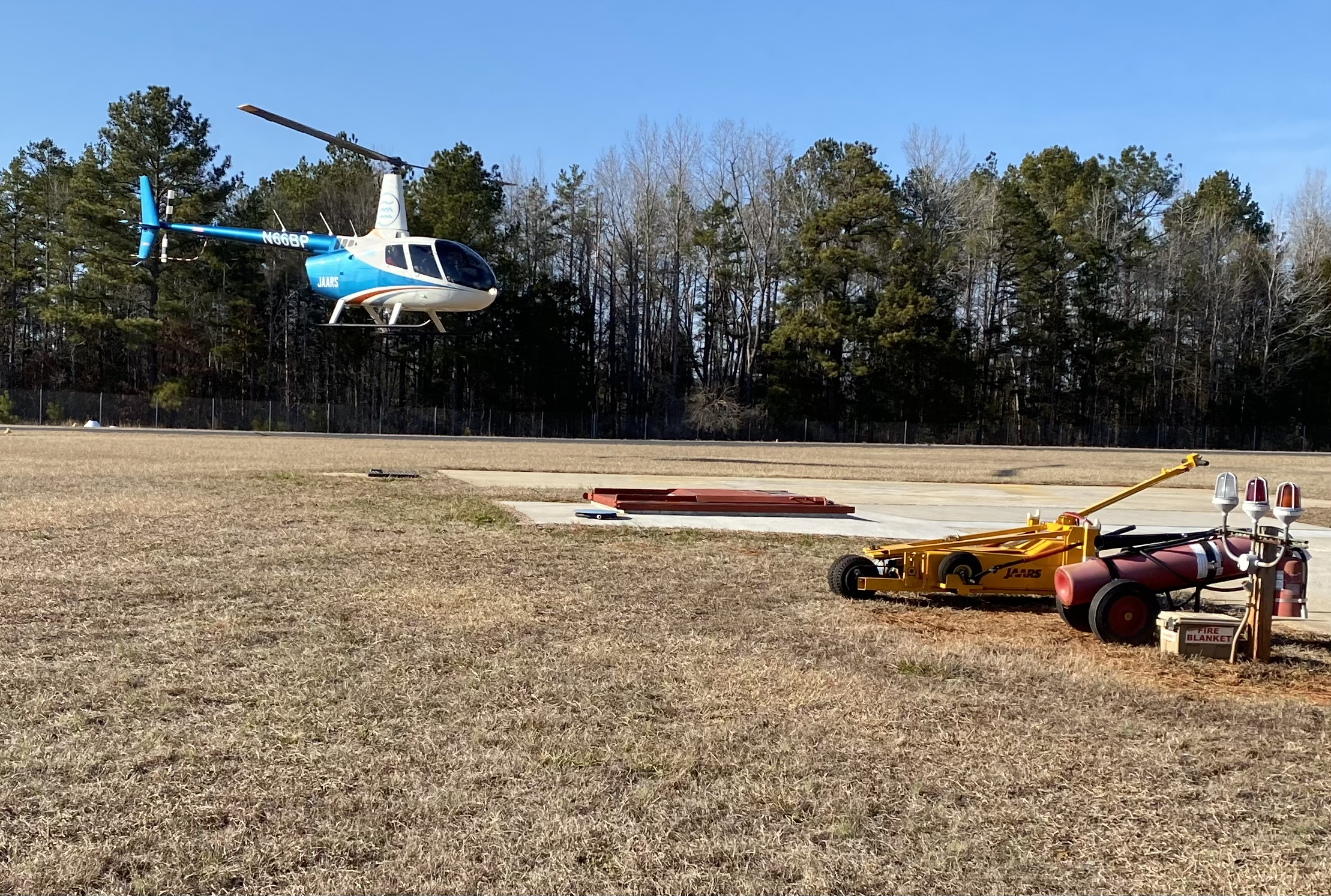
Robinson R66 Turbine Helicopter training at the JAARS Base.

The JAARS Air Operations team supports its field partners by providing critical training for pilots, mechanics, and avionics technicians who serve in remote, off-the-grid locations. JAARS also helps its field partners start and operate local aviation programs by training staff, setting standards, equipping aircraft, research, and more.

These field partners in turn offer transportation services to a range of individuals, including Bible translators, support staff, consultants, trainers, linguists, Christian mission organizations, hospitals, local communities, and governments. Their services can also include medical evacuations and disaster relief work.

JAARS' aviation partners fly a variety of aircraft, including:

- Bell Long Ranger helicopter, flown by in Papua New Guinea
- Robinson R66 helicopter, flown at the JAARS Base and by SIL International in Cameroon
- Cessna 172, flown at the JAARS Base
- Cessna 206, flown at the JAARS Base and by partners in Brazil, Cameroon, and Papua New Guinea
- Cessna 208 Caravan, flown by YAJASI in Indonesia
- Helio Courier, flown at the JAARS Base
- Pilatus PC-12, flown by YAJASI in Indonesia
- Pilatus PC-6, flown at the JAARS Base and by YAJASI in Indonesia
- Quest Kodiak, flown in Papua New Guinea

JAARS was one of fifteen organizations that financed the prototyping and development of the Quest Kodiak. JAARS also developed S-Seats, a seat for Bushliner 1850 that enhanced the crashworthiness and adaptability of the aircraft. JAARS also transported tons of supplies in the aftermath of Hurricane Helene.

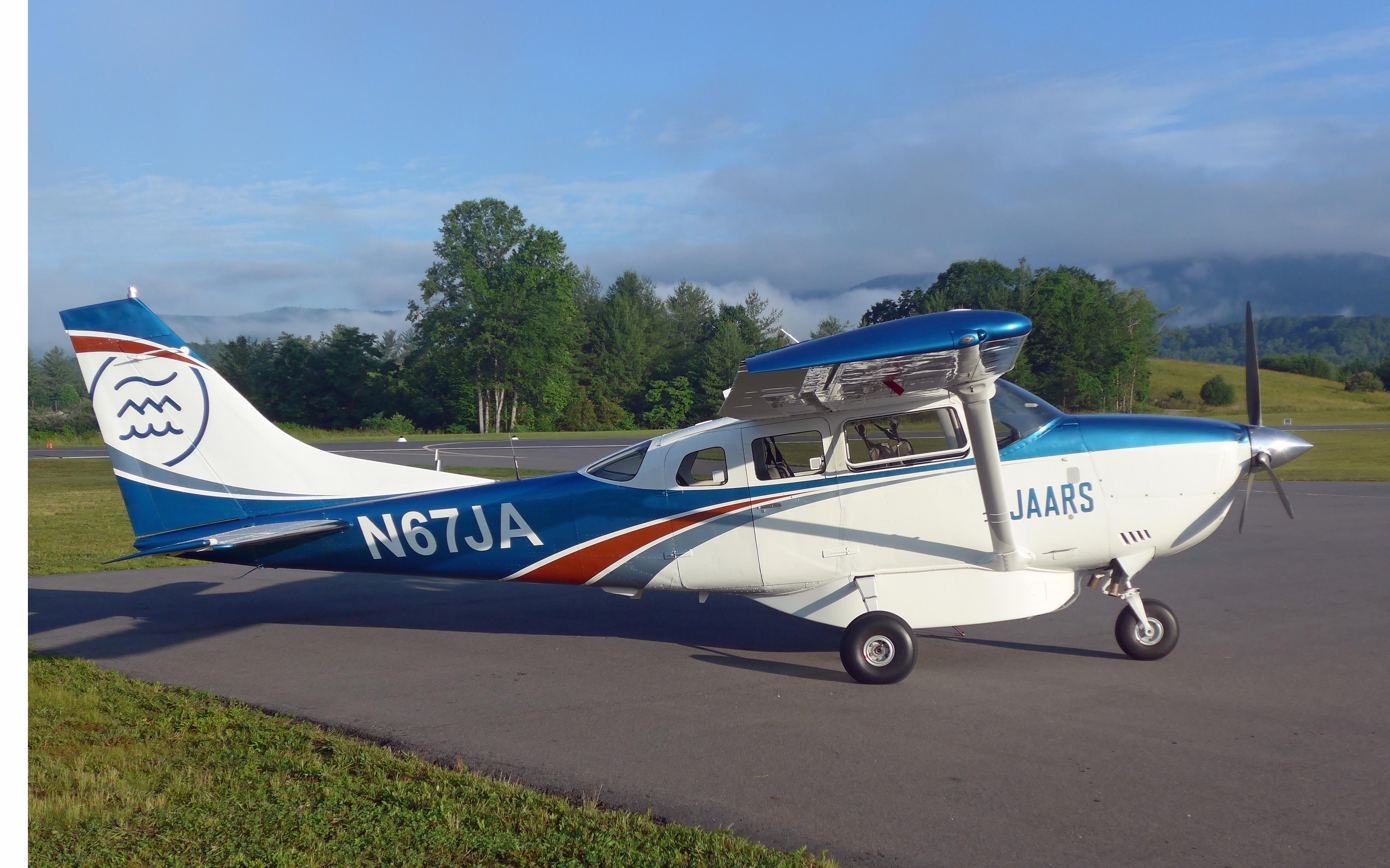
One of the two Cessna 206 aircraft in the JAARS training fleet.

Land Operations

The JAARS Land Operations team helps Bible translators and other missionaries travel safely by land with 4WD vehicles, motorbikes, and training in off-road driving and vehicle maintenance.

Sea Operations

The JAARS Sea Operations team provides boats, safety equipment, and water-safety training to Bible translators and other missionaries who travel on remote waters.

== Museum ==
The Alphabet Museum is located in the Pittman Building at the JAARS Base in Waxhaw, North Carolina. The museum was established in 1991 by JAARS founder William Cameron Townsend and focuses on the development of the world's alphabets and the history of writing systems and written languages. Exhibits include maps, paintings, sculptures, a replica of the Rosetta Stone, a Torah scroll that is over 150 years old and a handmade lyre. The alphabets covered include Greek, Arabic, Hebrew, Cyrillic and African languages.

The newly renovated Cardenas Building (named for former Mexican president Lázaro Cárdenas) features all-new exhibits showing why JAARS was founded and how they support mission work in the most remote places on earth. Interactives include airplane and boat models, an antique car, a motorcycle, and a "flying" helicopter.
