= Rob Hoskins =

Christian evangelist

- Born: May 18, 1965 (age 60); Bangor, Maine

Rob Hoskins (born May 18, 1965) is an American author and president of OneHope, a Christian evangelical organization.

== Biography ==
=== Early life ===
Rob Hoskins was born to missionary parents Bob and Hazel Hoskins in Bangor, Maine. In his early years he lived in Lebanon, France, California, and Florida. He received his primary education at the American International School in Lebanon, continued his junior high education at the International Lycée in France, and completed his senior high school education at Westminster Academy in Fort Lauderdale, Florida.

=== Career ===
During Hoskins's tenure, OneHope has worked on projects such as Bible App for Kids with YouVersion, Lead Today with John Maxwell and EQUIP, and Vision 2030.

Since 2004, Hoskins has been President of OneHope, Inc. Hoskins has also been on the Forum of Bible Agencies International (FOBAI), chair of the Strategy Working Group with the Lausanne Movement, and chair of the board at Oral Roberts University (ORU). He is the Senior Advisor to the World Evangelical Alliance (WEA). Hoskins is an ordained general-appointed missionary of the Assemblies of God Church.

== Research ==
In 2007, Hoskins helped initiate 44-country research program named Spiritual State of the World's Children, so that OneHope could learn more about the unique needs, experiences and social traditions of children and youth around the world, including the United States. Over the course of 4 years, more than 152,000 13- to 19-year-olds on 5 continents answered questions about their life. The research was collected by the Metadigm Group.

== Publications ==
- Maxwell, John C. and Hoskins, Rob (2021). Change Your World: How Anyone, Anywhere Can Make a Difference. HarperCollins Leadership. ISBN 978-1400222315
- Hoskins, Rob (2014). MissioLOGICAL: Thoughts on missions, leadership and reaching the next generation.
- Hoskins, Rob (2012). Hope Delivered: Affecting destiny through the power of God’s Word. Passio. ISBN 978-1616386757
- Hoskins, Rob (2002). Then…Seeds of Spiritual Lineage. Book of Hope. ISBN 978-1890525705
