= Kartidaya =

Christian organization

Kartidaya (derived from the Indonesian "[Kar]unia Bak[ti] Bu[daya]"; also known as Wycliffe Indonesia) is an Indonesian non-profit organization which is focused on promoting and supporting the work of Bible translation throughout Indonesia. They are an independent organization affiliated with Wycliffe Global Alliance, and have working agreements with numerous denominations throughout Indonesia. Each Kartidaya member has to find donors to cover their ministry and living expenses since Kartidaya does not give salaries to its members.

== History ==
Kartidaya first began in 1989. They have grown over the years and currently serve with over 60 different language communities.

== Leadership ==
The current director of Kartidaya is Nely Hergendi replacing Budi Santoso (still with Kartidaya upto Dec.2025); the previous directors in Kartidaya was Marnix Riupassa. and Nitya Travis.

== Training ==
Kartidaya has a strong focus on training, and they desire to equip Indonesians to be trained and prepared to translate the Bible into their own languages. There are currently over 400 languages in Indonesia without any of the Bible. This training is done in multiple locations including Kartidaya's main office in west Jakarta, Sulawesi, and Papua. Multiple times each year various aspects of the training are held at the various training locations.

== Affiliations ==
Kartidaya is a participant in the Wycliffe Global Alliance as well as the Forum of Bible Agencies International in Indonesia. They also work closely with the Indonesian Bible Society (Lembaga Alkitab Indonesia), the Indonesian Fellowship of Churches (Persekutuan Gereja-Gereja di Indonesia - PGI), Fellowship of Gospel Churches and Organizations in Indonesia (Persekutuan Gereja-gereja dan Lembaga-lembaga Injili Indonesia - PGLII), the International Reading Association, and many different churches and organizations throughout Indonesia and across Asia.

== See also ==
- Bible translations into the languages of Indonesia and Malaysia
- Christianity in Indonesia
