= Faith Comes By Hearing =

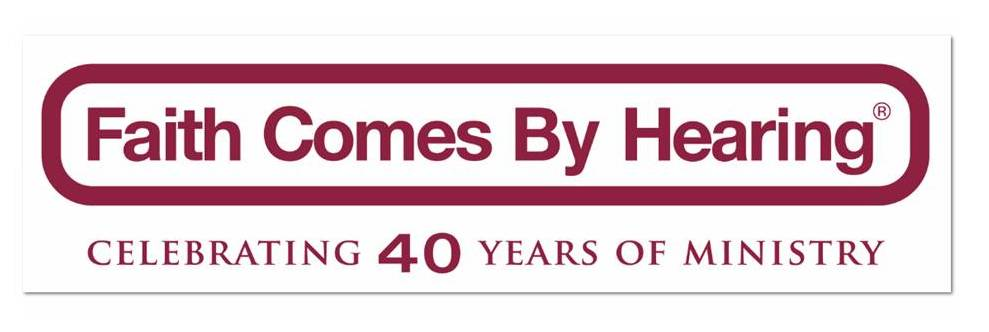
- Company type: Nonprofit organization
- Industry: Multilingual audio Bible distribution
- Founded: 1972
- Founders: Jerry Jackson; Anet Jackson
- Headquarters: Albuquerque, New Mexico, U.S.
- Area served: Worldwide
- Key people: Jerry Jackson (president and founder); Anet Jackson (co-founder)
- Website: www.faithcomesbyhearing.com

Faith Comes By Hearing is an international 501(c)(3) non-profit organization that records and freely provides the Bible in the languages of the world. It provides audio Bibles in more than 2,500 languages. The organization is a member of the Forum of Bible Agencies International and the Wycliffe Global Alliance. The chairman of the board for the organization is Jeff Solscheid, and its president is founder Jerry Jackson.

== History ==
The ministry, which began under the name "Hosanna", was founded in 1972 by Jerry Jackson and Anet Jackson (January 21, 1935 - December 20, 2025) as a library that lent cassette tapes geared toward Christian themes and ideas provided by various teachers. The idea for producing audio Bibles came from a missionary visit of theirs to a Hopi Indian reservation, where they discovered that written Bibles translated into the Hopi language were not being used due to chronic illiteracy.

Hosanna entered the international marketplace in 1986, when the ministry began working with several Haitian missionaries to record a Creole translation of the Bible. From 1986 forward, the ministry used revenues as well as donations to record translations of the Bible in hundreds of different languages. In 1991, its first international recording office opened in Ghana. The organization works with several Bible translators and distributors.

Language professor Alexander Arguelles stated that it is possible to use these recordings and the equivalent bible text in one's own language, to start learning any of the languages.

== Technology ==
In 2004 the ministry began distributing the Proclaimer, a device developed in house with an audio chip that can broadcasts recordings of the Bible to hundreds of people. Rechargeable via an electrical socket, solar energy, or a hand crank, the Proclaimer's battery can last through enough charges to play the New Testament more than 1,000 times. In 2006 the ministry began producing audio Bible MP3s, fitting the entire New Testament onto a single disc, instead of over a dozen CDs or tapes. During this period its revenues rose from $8 million to $22 million over four years. The Proclaimer has also been given for free to individuals in developing countries.

Later on the ministry developed the "BibleStick", a personal audio device that uses digital technology to broadcast. More than 900,000 BibleSticks have been donated to US soldiers overseas since their invention. The Biblestick sent to the military differs from those sent to other areas of the world, as it is designed to reduce visibility in low-light situations. Faith Comes By Hearing sunset it's Military Bible Stick program in 2025, citing advances in technology including increased digital access to Audio Bible, which have replaced the need for a dedicate physical playback devices for service members.

The organization forms Bible listening groups, and says they developed more than 85,000 of these groups worldwide in 2009, varying from a few dozen individuals to groups of thousands. The organization says they have now set up almost a million groups. As of January 2025, the ministry had produced audio Bible recordings in more than 1,500 languages.

The ministry's Bible.is app, available for both Apple and Android listening devices, provides Scripture in 1,889 languages. In November 2012, they added an app for the deaf community called the Deaf Bible app. In August 2014, the ministry launched the Bible.is Kidz app to help kids engage with the Bible through interactive games and activities.

Faith Comes By Hearing operates an API (application programming interface) for Bible-based applications called Bible Brain.

== See also ==
- Global recordings network
- Language education
- Audio Bible
