= The Bible League of Canada =

Bible League Canada
- Founded: 1948
- Type: Charitable organization
- Purpose: Placing Bibles, discipleship resources and training worldwide
- Region served: Africa, India, South East Asia, Eurasia, South America, Canada
- Method: Church Planter training, Adult Bible-based literacy, children's ministry, Supporting Christians persecuted for their faith
- Revenue: CDN$9.88 million (2011)
- Employees: 28 (2011)
- Website: www.bibleleague.ca

Bible League Canada, founded in 1948, is a charitable organization whose mission is to place Bibles into the hands of men, women and young people who want them. They do this through four strategic ministry programs including church planter training, adult Bible-based literacy programs, children's ministries, and supporting Christians persecuted for their faith. The organization seeks to bring the Christian message of Jesus Christ to people around the world because they believe that when people come into a relationship with Jesus through the Bible, lives are transformed from the inside out. The organization’s total revenue for fiscal year 2011 was $9.88 million. Of this amount, 56.59% ($5.6 million) is provided by Mission Thrift Stores. Bible League Canada is also a part of the Forum of Bible Agencies International.

== History ==
In 1948, The Bible League of Canada began as the Canadian affiliate of the American Home Bible League. Throughout the 1950s, the affiliate organization distributed Bibles door-to-door through local churches and various outreach ministries. The organization changed in 1959 when Jo Vander Boom was appointed to manage the organization's activities. In 1960, Jo's husband, John Vander Boom, was appointed as the first Canadian director and officially changed the name of the organization to the Canadian Home Bible League in 1962. In 1971, the organization was incorporated and became a legal entity separate from the American Home Bible League. The same year, an office in Weston, Ontario became the first purchased property, and an appeal for Cuba became the organization's first international project.

Vander Boom formed a group of prominent evangelical church leaders who lent their endorsements to the ministry of the Canadian Home Bible League. This action started the attainment of interdenominational support which continues to influence Bible League Canada today.

On December 11, 1984, the name of the organization was changed to the World Home Bible League of Canada, reflecting the organization's increasing commitment to international ministry. The present name, Bible League Canada, became official in 1992. In 1994, offices were moved to Burlington, Ontario. In 2007, the organization began operating its own international ministries apart from the U.S. Bible League operations. The offices are currently located in Grimsby, Ontario.

== Funding ==
The Bible League of Canada’s revenue comes from individual donors, churches, corporations, foundations, and Mission Thrift Stores. In 2009, 90% of funds raised were sent to their ministry programs around the world, 4.5% of its funding was spent on administration and 4.5% was spent on fund raising.

== Activities ==
The Bible League of Canada provides Bibles and community training worldwide by partnering with churches and mission organizations in Canada, India, Africa, Asia, Eastern Europe, and Latin America. The focus of the ministry involves four strategic ministry programs:

- Church Planter Training
- Adult Bible-based Literacy
- Children’s Ministry
- Support of the Persecuted Church

== About ==
The Bible League of Canada purpose is to do all they can to bring the Living Word of God into the hands of people around the world, providing Scriptures and training worldwide, so that people prepared by the Holy Spirit will be brought into relationship with Christ and His Church.

The Bible League of Canada does not send North Americans on the ground to preach God's word: they mentor local believers to instil this message within their communities. In fact, our ministry relies on three distinct parts working together to build a foundation for change. Bibles + Biblical Training + Local Champions = Transformed Lives. The people to share Jesus are those who live and breathe the local culture, speak the native tongue, and walk the same tough roads as their neighbours. These champions become mentors for family, friends and neighbours to grow movements that transform generations to come.

== Works ==
- Annual Report
- What We Do
