= Lifewords =

Christian organization

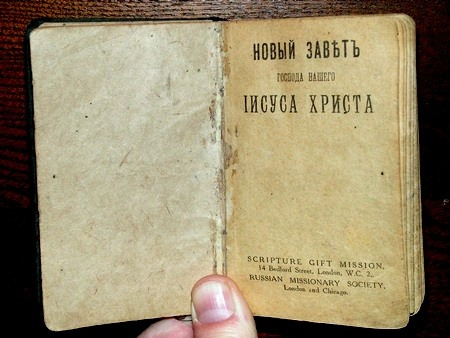
The New Testament in Russian from Scripture Gift Mission published in the late 19th or early 20th century

Lifewords (formerly Scripture Gift Mission) is a Christian mission based in London, but with offices worldwide. It exists to promote the positive influence of the Bible on everyday life. This has been done traditionally through literature distribution, but more recently includes websites, film, educational programmes and live events. Lifewords does not carry out mission initiatives directly, but provides resources to other mission organisations, churches, or individuals. All Lifewords' work is funded by donations, and the agency currently operates in over 25 countries.

== History ==
Scripture Gift Mission (SGM) was founded in 1888 by a printer named William Walters, who believed the Bible should be accessible to all. His two main innovations were to make the Bible available free of charge, and to dispatch two painters (James Clark and Henry Andrew Harper) to Palestine to produce illustrations. Both of these were controversial at the time, as it was felt that they devalued the scriptures. SGM produced Bible materials for troops in the Boer War in 1899, and the supply of military items was to become an important part of the mission's work, particularly during the two World Wars. In 1945, the society distributed hundreds of thousands of New Testaments according to the text of the Miniature Bible by Franz Eugen Schlachter to German POWs in English prisons.

In the post-war years, SGM continued to expand, starting offices in Australia, South Africa, Poland and India, among others. Translation work was an important feature of the mission, and SGM published its 1000th language in 2002, according to their Interact magazine.

Following changes in the nature of their work, and a desire to move into new fields, SGM rebranded in 2005 and became SGM Lifewords (since 2017 - Lifewords). The organisation celebrated its 125th anniversary in 2013.

== Current work ==
Lifewords produces literature in many languages, available from their offices worldwide or online. The resources are no longer free of charge. The range includes pastoral and counselling titles, ranges for Christmas and Easter, and more general evangelistic materials. Among Lifewords' broader portfolio is the Pavement Project, a counselling programme for street children, and Choose Life, a values education programme for Kenyan schools.
