= Ghana Institute of Linguistics, Literacy and Bible Translation =

The Ghana Institute of Linguistics, Literacy and Bible Translation (GILLBT) is an organisation involved in literacy, education and development projects in minority language communities in Ghana, as well as Bible translation work.

== History ==
GILLBT grew out of work begun by linguists from Wycliffe Bible Translators, who began working with the Institute of African Studies at the University of Ghana in 1962. In 1980, a new organisation was established to continue the work, the Ghana Institute of Linguistics (GIL). In 1982, its name was changed to the Ghana Institute of Linguistics, Literacy and Bible Translation (GILLBT).

== Associations ==
GILLBT has continued its original connection with the University of Ghana, mainly with the Institute of African Studies (IAS), but also with the Institute of Adult Education, the Department of Linguistics, and the Language Centre. Linguistic and anthropological research conducted by GILLBT members is often published by IAS. GILLBT is also a member organisation of the Wycliffe Global Alliance.

== Funding ==
GILLBT is funded from a variety of sources, including individual donors and other organisations. It has also generated income from running guesthouses in Accra and Tamale and operating a printing press.

== Work ==
=== Literacy and education ===
GILLBT has partnered with other organisations to run a Complementary Basic Education programme, which offers nine months of classes in mother tongue literacy for unschooled children.

=== Translation ===
GILLBT is one of three main organisations involved in Bible translation in Ghana, alongside the Bible Society of Ghana and the International Bible Society. In addition to its involvement in Bible translation, GILLBT collaborated with National Commission for Civic Education to translate an abridged version of the 1992 Constitution of Ghana into 30 Ghanaian languages, and with the International Federation of Women Lawyers to translate the "Rights of Ghanaian Women" into minority languages.
