= Bob Hoskins (missionary) =

American Christian missionary and author (1936–2026)

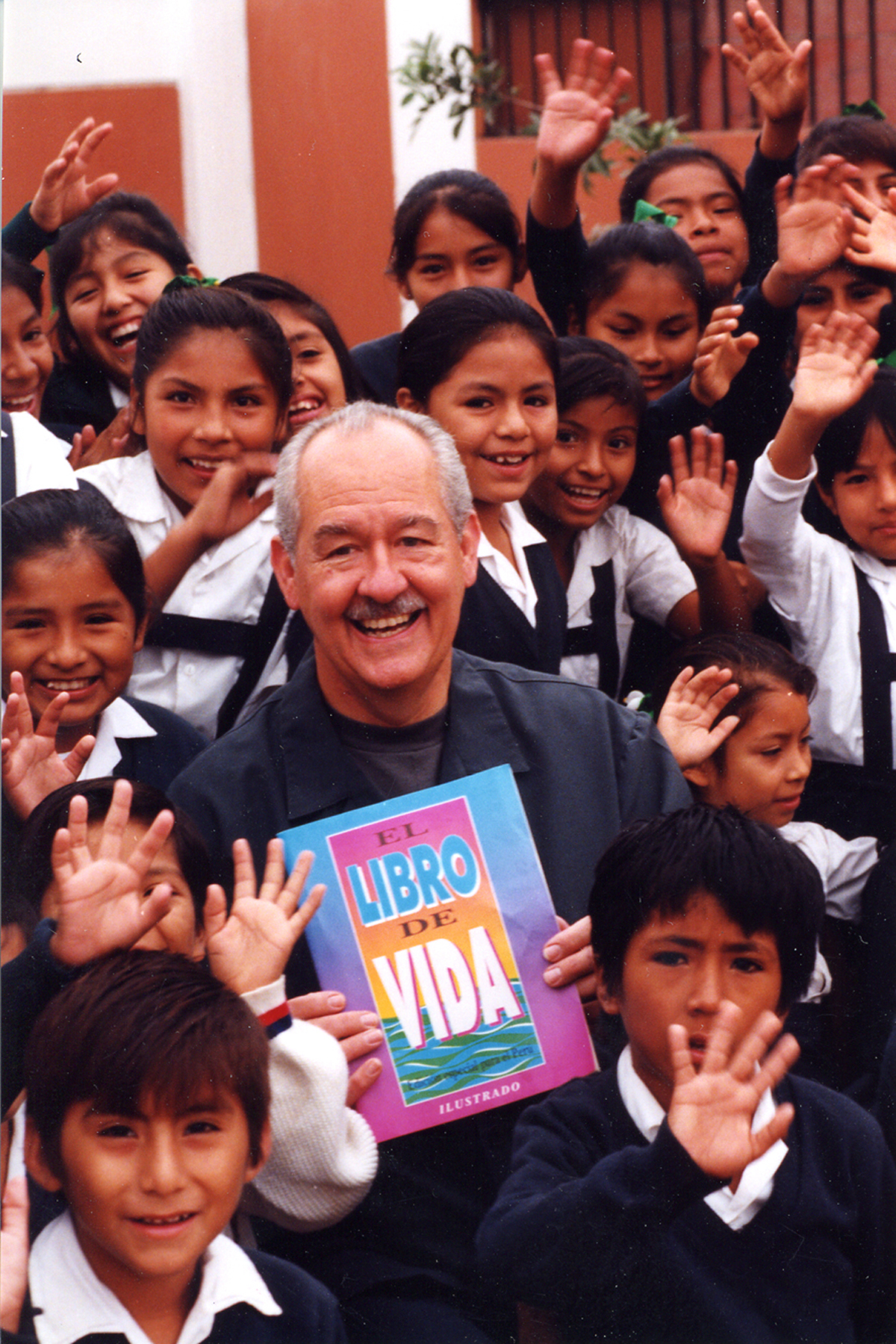

Personal life
- Born: April 15, 1936 Ponca City, Oklahoma, U.S.
- Died: November 14, 2026 (aged 90) Pompano Beach, Florida, U.S.
- Website: www.onehope.net

Religious life
- Religion: Christianity
- Denomination: Evangelical

Senior posting
- Period in office: 1987–2026

Bob Hoskins (April 15, 1936 – November 14, 2026) was an American Christian missionary, author, and the founder of OneHope (formerly known as 'Book of Hope International') in 1987.

== Early life ==
At 19, Hoskins met Hazel Crabtree at a church event where he was preaching in Little Rock, Arkansas. Four years later, on September 5, 1959, they were married in a ceremony in Sacramento, California, before leaving for the mission field abroad.

== Career ==
=== Early ministry ===
In 1964, the Hoskins planted churches in the Middle East and North Africa. The ministries they established under the name Middle East Outreach included correspondence courses, radio ministry, a seminary, and the organizing of missionary outreach to that area of the world.

In 1965, the Hoskins moved to Beirut, Lebanon, where they lived and raised their three children. In that country, Bob launched The Way of Life Literature Ministry.

=== Life Publishers International ===
After 15 years abroad, Hoskins returned to the United States with his family in 1980. They relocated to Miami, Florida, where Bob assumed the presidency of the newly formed Life Publishers International; a literature ministry. He continued leading Life Publishers until 1996, when the denomination he was affiliated with sold the publishing entity to Zondervan Publishers.

=== OneHope ===
In 1987, Hoskins launched 'Book of Hope International ministries'. As the ministry expanded beyond print to digital media, the ministry was renamed OneHope.

The first 968,000 Books of Hope - customized, Bible-based children's publications - were delivered in 1987 to every schoolchild in El Salvador at the request of the country's Minister of Education.

In 2004, Bob's son, Rob Hoskins, became president of OneHope.

== Personal life and death ==
On June 22, 2015, Hazel Hoskins died at the age of 81.

Bob remarried and, as of 2011, resided in Hillsboro Beach, Florida, with his second wife, Helen.

On November 15, 2026, OneHope announced on LinkedIn that he had died the previous day. Hoskins was 90. He had been diagnosed with stage IV lung cancer, which had been announced in April 2025.

== Publications ==
Hoskins authored books including All They Want Is the Truth.

- The Middle East and the Third World War (1982)
- All They Want Is the Truth (1985)
- The Destiny Changing Book (1986)
- They Still Want the Truth (1987)
- Russia, The Miracle of the Open Door (1991)
- Winning the Race for Russia (1992)
- Voices of Destiny (1993)
- Study War No More (1994)
- Affect Destiny (2003)
- The Indestructible Seed (2004)
