= International Conference on Missions =

Christian organization

International Conference on Missions (ICOM)
- Founded: 1954 (originally, National Missionary Convention)
- Type: 501(c)(3) religious non-profit corporation.
- Purpose: Encouraging, Equipping, and Enlisting workers for the harvest.
- Location: Clayton, Indiana, US, 95 E. CR 1000 S. (Main Office)
- Method: Through an annual conference that gathers missionaries, mission organizations, global ministries, and local Christians and congregations.
- Key people: Rob Maupin (Chief Executive Director) Emily Drayne (Chief Operations Officer)
- Website: theicom.org

The International Conference on Missions (ICOM) is a non-denominational, non-profit, Christian organization that organizes an annual conference on missions for the Unaffiliated Christian Church/Church of Christ congregations around the world. It was originally known as the National Missionary Convention (1954–2011). It has theological roots in the Restoration Movement.

== Past conferences ==
- ICOM 1983: Des Moines, IA
- ICOM 2019: Kansas City, MO
- ICOM 2020: Indianapolis, IN
- ICOM 2021: Richmond, VA
- ICOM 2022: Columbus, OH
- ICOM 2023: Oklahoma City, OK
- ICOM 2024: Lexington, KY
- ICOM 2025: Atlanta, GA

== Future conferences ==
- ICOM 2026: St. Louis, MO (November 12–14, 2026 )
- ICOM 2027 Richmond, VA
- ICOM 2028 Cincinnati, OH
- ICOM 2029 Kansas City, MO
