= Jesus Film Project =

Christian ministry organization

- Jesus Film Project
- Formation: 1981; 45 years ago
- Founder: Bill Bright
- Type: Nonprofit
- Headquarters: 100 Lake Hart Drive Orlando, FL, 32832
- Region served: International
- Products: Jesus film
- Parent organization: Cru
- Revenue: $56.04 million
- Expenses: $25.99 million
- Website: www.jesusfilm.org

The Jesus Film Project is an organization created in 1981 by Campus Crusade for Christ founder Bill Bright to distribute the 1979 film, Jesus, not only in English, but also in many of the world's languages, aiming to make the story of Jesus accessible to people worldwide by providing it in their native languages. The Jesus Film Project is also a member of the Forum of Bible Agencies International.

== History ==
Bright wanted to bring a biblically accurate depiction of the life, ministry, and death of Jesus to the big screen, and in 1979, filming began in the Middle East with British Shakespearean actor Brian Deacon in the role of Jesus.

When the original American theatrical run of Jesus ended in 1980, Bright asked Paul Eshleman, who was involved in the production, to head the organization. Eshleman remained in the position until 2004, when Jim Green was named as the organization's executive director.

By the end of 2023, the Jesus film was available in 2210 languages, and viewed over 598 million times. This was up from the 2018 figures of being available in 1,724 languages. and had been viewed nearly 375 million times at that time. This has resulted in the Jesus film being recognized by The Guinness Book of World Records as the "Most Translated Film" in history, revealing the seriousness with which the Jesus Film Project takes their objective to share the gospel with people from every nation, tribe, and tongue. As of July 2026, the film was available in 2,303 languages.

== Mission 865 ==
Starting in 2010, Mission 865 (M865) is one of the largest ongoing initiatives of the Jesus Film Project. It is an initiative to translate the Jesus film into the native language of each people group with 50,000 or more speakers – and smaller languages as determined, particularly targeting the 10/40 window. This would ensure that 99% of the world would have access to the film in a language they can understand. In 2010, when the project was launched, there were 865 languages that they wished to translate the film into. The goal is to complete these 865 languages by the end of 2025.

As of 1 March 2023, 612 languages of the targeted 865 had a translated film. As of August 2024, this had increased to 694 languages, representing an almost 78% completion rate. As of June 2026, 741 languages had been completed - about 85% of the goal.

== Magdalena: Released from Shame ==
In 2007, the project released the movie Magdalena: Released from Shame, which utilized footage from the project's 1980 film Jesus. The movie told the story of Jesus as seen through the eyes of four different women: the Virgin Mary, Mary Magdalene, the Samaritan woman at the well, and Elizabeth. Critical reception for the movie was positive and the film is heavily utilized in missionary work. It is now available in 200 languages.

== Rivka ==
The Jesus Film Project released three additional films in 2011: Rivka, a 12-episode series; Walking with Jesus, a 5-episode series "produced by Africans for Africans"; and an animation, My Last Day.

== See also ==
- Jesus of Nazareth (TV series) with Robert Powell as Jesus
- The Gospel of John (2003 film) with Henry Ian Cusick as Jesus
- The Visual Bible: Matthew with Bruce Marchiano as Jesus
