= The Seed Company =

American Bible translation organization

Seed Company, also referred to as SC or formally The Seed Company, is an American Bible translation organization. It is a member of the Wycliffe Global Alliance.

SC was launched in 1993 by a former president of Wycliffe USA, Bernie May. Their focus is on linking donors to Bible translation projects where local people are doing Bible translation into their own languages.

Seed Company is also a member of the Forum of Bible Agencies International.

The current chief executive officer is Davis H. Powell.
