= OneHope =

International Christian evangelical organization

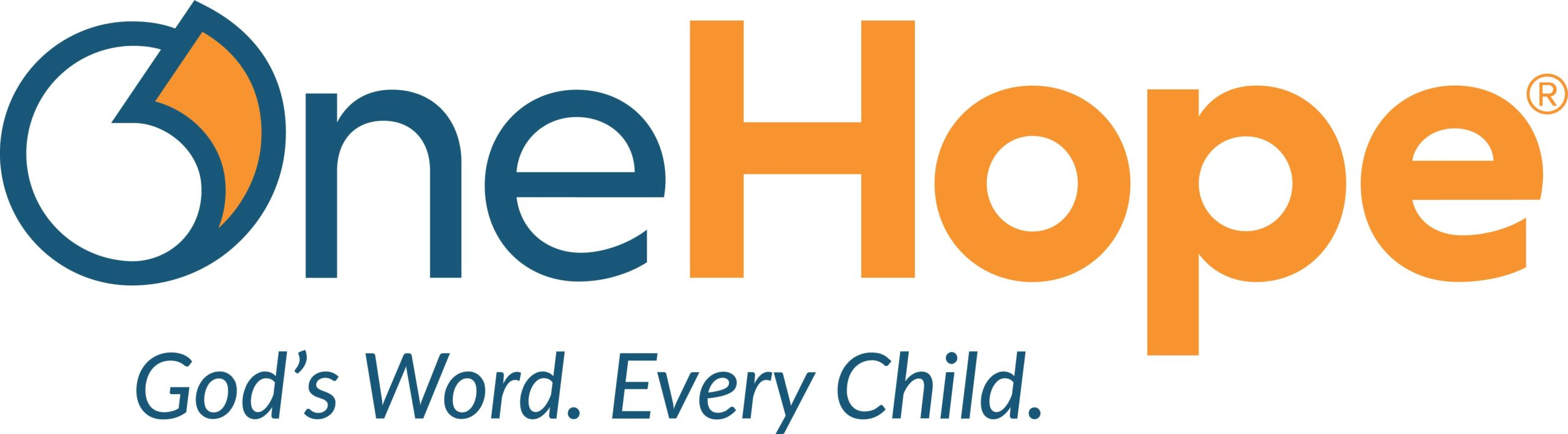
- Founded: 1987
- Founder: Bob Hoskins
- Type: Children and Youth Mission Organization
- Region served: 179 countries
- Key people: Rob Hoskins (president)
- Website: OneHope.net
- Formerly called: Book of Hope

OneHope is a Christian evangelical organization based in Pompano Beach, Florida. Founded in 1987 by Bob Hoskins, the organization creates and distributes magazines, movies, games, and other Christian-themed content targeted for children. It has also conducted research on children's attitudes towards faith.

== History ==
OneHope (formerly Book of Hope International) was founded in 1987 by former missionary and Life Publishers president Bob Hoskins. In 2004, Rob Hoskins was appointed president of OneHope.

=== Research ===
In 2007, OneHope launched a 44-country research initiative to learn more about children and youth's unique needs, experiences and social traditions around the world. In 2020, OneHope released another research study entitled Global Youth Culture - analyzing the trends and behaviors of 13-19 year olds in 20 different countries. OneHope's research on church planting in French-speaking Africa was also featured in EMQ in 2021.

=== Films ===
Running Deer was the fourth partnership between ToyGun Films and OneHope. The film focuses on a high school cross country star growing up in a Native American community, who faces a barrage of personal struggles the day before the most important race of his life. It won the Grand Jury Award at dead CENTER Film Festival in 2013. In 2012, Half Good Killer was created in partnership with Toy Gun films and filmed in Cape Town, South Africa. Half Good Killer follows a jaded child soldier fighting for an African rebel force. In 2011, the short film Paper Flower, created by Toy Gun Films and OneHope for use in Japan, addressed a casual form of prostitution, compensated dating. En Tus Manos was another short film developed by Toy Gun Films and OneHope with the objective of fighting gang violence in Latin American countries.
