= Instituto Lingüístico de Verano (Peru) =

Non-profit linguistic organization

The Instituto Lingüístico de Verano (abbreviated ILV, in English: Summer Institute of Linguistics) is a non-profit organization based in Peru that serves as the branch affiliated with SIL International. collaborating with the Ministry of Education in activities that concern ethno-linguistics investigation (subject that studies in depth the knowledge of every language and prepares diverse educational materials) and the social and educational promotion of the vernacular-speaking communities, by means of the literacy and training programs to form native teachers.

The qualified educators by the ILV devote themselves not only to reading and writing teaching in their communities in their own native languages, but also in Spanish. They teach in both languages progressively to achieve a suitable social and cultural integration of the settlers.

The children' progress has arisen the desire to learn how to read in adults. For them there are programs that integrate basic notions of arithmetic, hygiene and Spanish, to facilitate their development in daily life.

The ILV also offers its cooperation, when it is requested, in different campaigns of the Ministry of Health.

== See also ==
- SIL International
- Instituto Lingüístico de Verano (Mexico), the equivalent organization in Mexico
