= Wycliffe Global Alliance =

Alliance of Evangelical Christian organizations

- Formation: 1 May 1980
- Type: Association
- Purpose: Bible translation
- Region served: Worldwide
- Website: wycliffe.net

Wycliffe Global Alliance is an alliance of Evangelical Christian organizations that have the objective of translating the Bible into every language. The organisation is named after John Wycliffe, who was responsible for the first complete English translation of the whole Bible into Middle English.

Wycliffe is most often associated with the Protestant section of Christianity. There are currently over 100 Wycliffe member organisations from over 60 countries. Wycliffe Global Alliance is also a member of the Forum of Bible Agencies International.

As of August 2025, Wycliffe Global Alliance estimated that translations of either portions of the Bible, the New Testament, or the whole Bible exist in over 4,007 of the 7,396 languages used on Earth, including 392 sign languages. This comprised the full text of the Bible being available in 776 languages, the New Testament in 1,798 languages, and portions of scripture in 1,433 languages. This is an increase from scripture being available in 3,756 languages in September 2024 and, from 3,415 languages in 2020.

== History ==
Wycliffe Bible Translators USA was founded in 1942 by William Cameron Townsend. When other Wycliffe organisations were founded around the world, they initially operated as its divisions in those countries. A new organisation, Wycliffe Bible Translators International, was started in May 1980 to provide this international leadership.

In 1991 Wycliffe International was restructured so that the Wycliffe organisations in each country became fully independent, causing Wycliffe International to become an association of organisations. In February 2011, Wycliffe International took on a new "doing business as" name, Wycliffe Global Alliance.

In 1999, Vision 2025, was adopted by Wycliffe Bible Translators International and SIL. It envisioned that Bible translation would be started within a generation (25 years) for every language that still needs it. At that time, over 5,000 languages were still in need of translation. By August 2025, this had plunged to only 544 remaining, representing 36.8 million people (about 0.5% of the world's population).

== Philosophy and methods ==
Wycliffe bases its philosophy on Townsend's Protestantism which regards the intercultural and multilinguistic spread of Christianity as a divine command. The organization adheres to the principle of sola scriptura and regards Biblical texts as the authoritative and infallible word of God.

Wycliffe states its focus is participating with and encouraging Christian churches to minister to minority languages, so that every language community can have access to the Bible.

Wycliffe Global Alliance emphasizes its international nature. It describes itself as "multicultural, multinational, creative and facilitative." Wycliffe Global Alliance has its headquarters in Singapore. The Global Leadership Team is a virtual team and is spread across Africa, the Americas, Asia, Australia, and Europe.

== Associated organisations ==
- Finland: Wycliffe Raamatunkääntäjät
- Germany: Allianz-Mission, Wycliff
- Ghana: GILLBT
- Indonesia: Kartidaya, Gereja Protestan Indonesia Donggala, Protestant Church of Maluku
- Netherlands: Wycliffe Bijbelvertalers
- Norway: Wycliffe Norge
- United Kingdom: Wycliffe Bible Translators (UK & Ireland), MissionAssist
- United States: Wycliffe Bible Translators USA, Seed Company, Faith Comes By Hearing

== See also ==
- Bible translations by language
- Joshua Project
