= William Cameron Townsend =

American missionary (1896–1982)

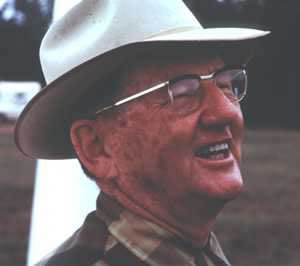
- Born: July 9, 1896; Eastvale, California
- Died: April 23, 1982 (aged 85); Waxhaw, North Carolina
- Education: Santa Ana High School; Graduated in 1914; Occidental College (1914-17)
- Occupations: Missionary; Linguist
- Spouse(s): Elvira Townsend (née Malmstrom) (Married Jul 9, 1919 – Dec 24, 1944); Elaine Townsend (née Mielke) (Married Nov 6, 1946 – July 14, 1982)
- Children: Grace Goreth (née Townsend); Joy Tuggy (née Townsend); Elainadel (née Townsend); William Crowell Townsend
- Parent(s): William Townsend; Molly Townsend

William Cameron Townsend (July 9, 1896 – April 23, 1982) was an American Christian missionary-linguist and the founder of Wycliffe Bible Translators and the Summer Institute of Linguistics (now SIL Global).

Both organizations emphasized the translation of the Bible into minority languages, as well as the development of literacy and bilingual education programs.

== Early life ==
Born in 1896 in Southern California, Townsend graduated from Santa Ana High School and attended Occidental College in Los Angeles. He dropped out of college to work as a Bible salesman for the Los Angeles Bible House for several years.

== Work in Guatemala ==
=== First Translation Work ===
On 18 August 1917 the Los Angeles Bible House sent Townsend to Guatemala to sell Spanish Bibles near Antigua. After two years he joined the Central American Mission (CAM).

CAM was an evangelical Christian mission of the Disciples of Christ among the Kaqchikel Maya people in Guatemala, founded by Protestant revivalists who had agreed to divide their mission work in Central America into various regions. CAM taught that Jesus Christ's Millennial Kingdom of Peace would come after the Second Coming of Christ and viewed their mission as necessary to fulfill Christ's Great Commission to carry his message "to the ends of the earth" (Acts 1:8).

Townsend was concerned that CAM's Christian message, spread exclusively in Spanish, could not reach the monolingual majority of the indigenous population.

He settled in a Kaqchikel community on the coast called Santa Catarina, and over the next fourteen years he learned the language to the point where he could translate the Bible. He also founded the Robinson Bible Institute which, with financial backing from U.S. sources, built a center for the indigenous community that included a school, medical clinic, an electrical generator, a coffee processing plant, and an agricultural supply store. During these years, Townsend's concern for the indigenous community grew, and he became convinced that the missionary practices he observed did not address their needs effectively and did not take into account their diverse languages and cultures.

According to Colby and Dennet, Townsend's CAM superiors also showed signs of unease that he had adopted indigenous cultural practices, clothing, and language.

=== Oppression and Causes ===
As Townsend looked for the root of indigenous poverty and marginalization, he believed that he found three main causes. One was the mixed-race ladino middlemen who were closely associated with a "folk" Catholic religion that was quite distinct from orthodox Catholicism. Another was in some of the Mesoamerican traditions, some of which were similar to those the dominant Spanish culture imposed. Numerous saints required many days of festivals laden with the obligatory purchases and excessive consumption of food and alcohol, much of which needed to be purchased from the ladino middlemen. A third cause was the lack of modern healthcare. Townsend thus viewed the Maya around him as trapped from both within and without, and he searched for a way to help liberate them.

==== Plans for Translation ====
Townsend viewed true conversion to Christ as a solution to the challenges of indigenous peoples, but he had to discover why Protestant and Catholic missions did not attract many indigenous converts to orthodox Christian beliefs. He believed that the main reason was that the illiterate monolinguals had no access to scripture. Many Indians could not read, and even those who could, did not have the Bible in a language they could understand. Although heterodox syncretism was the norm in indigenous communities, the Catholic clergy refused Bible translation, fearing exegesis which did not agree with Catholic tradition. The Protestant missions concentrated on Spanish-speaking ladino overseers as converts instead of on the speakers of minority indigenous languages.

Townsend wished to see a mission that sought to produce indigenous-run, self-sufficient, Bible-based Christian congregations. He believed that this could lead to a more just society, trusting that if the Christian scriptures were well translated and well understood, they had the power to change individuals and society for the better. One very important step toward this goal was the development of groups of indigenous people who were literate, first in their own language and later in Spanish as well, and to help them produce a translation of at least the New Testament and key parts of the Old Testament in their native tongue. Townsend firmly believed that if the Christian Scriptures were well translated and well understood, they had the power to change individuals and society for the better. He often said that the Bible in the language of the people was the best missionary of all, because it "never got sick, never took a furlough, and never sounded like a foreigner".

==== The importance of Linguistics in Bible translation ====
Townsend understood the importance of linguistic theory in the training of those who would translate Scripture. At this time Edward Sapir and Leonard Bloomfield were writing on this area and he used some of Sapir's insight in his analysis of Kaqchikel. Townsend planned for trainee translators to gain access to a rural community, work with locals to learn the language, produce an alphabet for that language and publish literature on local stories, folk tales, histories and culture. They could then set up literacy and healthcare programmes and eventually complete a Bible translation. In this way, he hoped that translation and conversion would happen alongside social development.

==== Plan for First Translation Community ====
As this Bible translation movement developed, Townsend moved from Guatemala to Mexico to Peru, with a special focus on the vast Amazon basin. For centuries the tribes of the Amazon had been evangelized by the Jesuits until their expulsion from the Portuguese empire in the late eighteenth century.

Many of the Amazonian indigenous groups remained elusive. Townsend proposed using airplanes and radios to stay connected with the isolated tribes, but the financial and timely costs of new technology for such labor-intensive work was off-putting to many mission groups.

By 1933 Townsend decided to move to Mexico. This came after he met and befriended the Mexican Under-Secretary of Education, Moisés Sáenz, in Panajachel, Guatemala. Sick with tuberculosis, Townsend returned to the US in 1932 and sought the help of L.L. Legters, the field secretary of the Pioneer Mission Agency and a trusted friend. At a prayer meeting in August 1933, "'the Lord revealed his will for... Mr. WC Townsend of Guatemala to make a trip to Mexico City for the purpose of meeting with the government to get permission for sending men into the Indian tribes to learn the languages and to translate the Bible into those Indian tongues.'" Just two months later, a letter from Sáenz arrived urging both men, Townsend and Legters, to visit Mexico.

== Mexico ==
The triumphant faction of the Mexican Revolution created the Constitution of 1917, which extended the anticlerical measures of the liberal Constitution of 1857 and restricted the Catholic Church in Mexico. Townsend and Legters, however, entered Mexico without missionary credentials. Having cut all formal organizational ties, including those to CAM, the two men used Sáenz's letter of invitation to travel to Mexico City. This instance represents the first of what later critical authors would view as 'deceits,' whereby the two men concealed their deeper goal behind a veil of government permission. Other critics note that Sáenz knew why they wanted to come to Mexico.

During their trip Townsend and Legters made contact with Americans and Mexican officials. Key among these was Rafael Ramírez, director of rural education in the Ministry of Public Education (SEP). Townsend inaugurated a portion of the Pan-American highway on July 1, 1936.

== Relationship with Lázaro Cárdenas ==
While Townsend had previously seen the president in August of 1935 during the opening of the Seventh American Scientific Congress in the Palace of Fine Arts in Mexico City, his first interaction with the president came several months later. On January 21, 1936, President Lázaro Cárdenas, encountered Townsend in the small town of Tetelcingo in the state of Morelos. Townsend had been teaching the local indigenous people to read in their native Aztec language. Townsend had been gardening in a small vegetable and flower garden when Cárdenas arrived at the town in two motor cars, attracting a large crowd in the square of the town, near the school teaches' living quarters. Townsend, still wearing his gardener's clothes, introduced himself to the president and remarked, "I am glad that you are a friend of the peasants, for you have found me one today." Following an inspection of the trailer home and classrooms of the town, Cárdenas spoke to a crowd of several hundred indigenous villagers, who voiced their problems to the president. Several months later, Cárdenas delivered cement, nursery supplies, and cattle to the community, along with a new industrial school and irrigation system. Following his visit to Townsend at Tetelcingo, both men interacted with one another frequently, such as Townsend's visit to the president's vestibule when he was in his office in Mexico City.

Townsend remarked that "the best place to see Cárdenas in action is in a rural community." Cárdenas traveled nearly 71,905 miles during his campaigning for and time as President of Mexico. Townsend greatly admired the president's dedication to visiting rural indigenous communities, and estimated that Cárdenas traveled to around 70,000 villages, like Tetelcingo, throughout his life.

Townsend, who had spent most of his life living with indigenous groups across Latin America, aligned strongly with the president's compassion and political goals for the indigenous people of Mexico. He considered the president and himself friends of the natives. Together, they formed a friendship that lasted throughout Townsend's time in Mexico and beyond, with Cárdenas being Townsend's best man at his wedding.

Townsend's relationship with Cárdenas was also inherently political, serving as a gateway into the development of the Summer Institute of Linguistics. Townsend understood that access to indigenous communities across the globe required governmental favor. Protestant missionaries were banned or strictly regulated in most Catholic countries, meaning Townsend's work required academic, social, and philanthropical work. However, the anti-clerical stances of the Mexican government, specifically its Anti-Catholicism enabled the work of Townsend as a linguist, rather than as a missionary. Cárdenas subordinated his personal desires to implement effective political action, and lowered the barriers for missionaries in Mexico, primarily to develop the bilingual linguistic programs of missionaries like Townsend. Indeed, Townsend initially had trouble entering the country in 1933, and was almost prevented from entering Mexico by border security. This compromise greatly benefited both the linguistics work of Townsend, and Cárdenas ambitions of improving the lives of indigenous people, as Cárdenas publicly praised Townsend's work with a written endorsement.

Townsend published a biography on Cárdenas in 1952, more than a decade after they met. The biography has been noted by some historians as being more panegyric than biographical, and is strongly biased in favor of Cárdenas. However, as historian Frank E. Tannenbaum notes, "It is difficult for anyone who has known General Cárdenas to write about him dispassionately." The book contains a few factual errors and inaccuracies, but overall served as a strong biography of Cárdenas throughout the 1950s.

Townsend notes that his experiences in Mexico City greatly shaped his political attitudes towards the president and socialist policies, which are reflected in his biography of Cárdenas.

== Creation of SIL ==
Townsend founded SIL Global (formerly known as the Summer Institute of Linguistics) in 1934.

Townsend always claimed that SIL was an academic institution that applied original linguistic research to the solution of human problems and to the creation of an indigenous literature that included both the collection and publication in written form of previously oral histories and stories and the translation of "works of high moral value", especially the Bible, but also often including the sections of national constitutions most relevant to indigenous rights, and later the translation of the U.N. Universal Declaration of Human Rights.

He explained that, although SIL was not a religious institution per se, its members were lay Christians motivated by their faith to serve the minority language groups of the world.

Within SIL there was some debate as to whether they should define themselves as true "missionaries" or not. They were certainly not traditional sectarian missionaries as they did not found churches themselves and co-operated with Catholics, Protestants and secularists alike. However, their vision included, among many other humanitarian goals, that of providing minority language communities with access to the Bible, and then trusting that the Christian Scriptures would bring about positive spiritual and material transformations in individuals and societies.

SIL's creation coincided with the emergence of a body of intellectual thought that had already begun to circulate in the Mexican intelligentsia, called indigenismo. Many Mexican intellectuals had begun to believe in the gradual incorporation of indigenous cultures into the national society while still preserving those original cultures by applying the principles of cultural anthropology and linguistics.

== Creation of Wycliffe ==
Townsend and Legters had opened Camp Wycliffe in Arkansas in the summer of 1934. Named for John Wycliffe, who was responsible for the first complete English translation of the Bible, the camp was designed to train young people in basic linguistics and translation methods.

Because the Mexican government did not allow missionary work through its educational system, Townsend founded Wycliffe Bible Translators as a separate organization from SIL. Wycliffe Bible Translators focused on Bible translation and missionary activities, whereas SIL focused on linguistic documentation and literacy education.

In the first year two students enrolled. The following year, after a training session with five men in attendance (including Kenneth Pike who would become a lifelong friend and prominent academic linguist), Townsend took his students to Mexico to begin field work.

Wycliffe Bible Translators USA was officially founded in 1942. Wycliffe Bible Translators International was established in May 1980 to provide international leadership.

== Soviet Union ==
Townsend went to the Soviet Union with his wife to preach to people in the Caucasus Mountains. They made 11 trips there.

== Controversy ==
In 1940, Townsend wrote a short book (80 pages) in English explaining the abuses of international oil companies in Mexico and defending the Cardenas government's nationalization of them. (See W.C. Townsend, The Truth about Mexico's Oil, 1940, SIL).

Townsend was the subject of the highly critical book Thy Will Be Done: The Conquest of the Amazon: Nelson Rockefeller and Evangelism in the Age of Oil by journalists Gerard Colby and Charlotte Dennett.

== Jungle Aviation and Relay Service ==
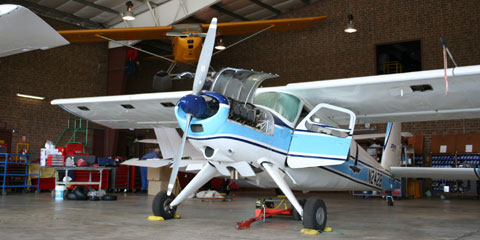
Helio Courier, a light C/STOL utility aircraft designed in 1949; in a JAARS' hangar in 2005

By 1948 Townsend created the Jungle Aviation and Radio Service. Until this point operations were held together by a jeep and several two-way radios provided by the U.S. Embassy. A U.S. Army Air Corps mission pilot, Larry Montgomery, contacted Townsend in 1946, informing him that a Grumman Duck, a navy amphibious plane, was on sale as army surplus for a cheap price. The plane proved its worth and in one incident it served as the sole rescue transport for a crashed Peruvian military plane in 1947.

Townsend knew that a small fleet of planes would require a hangar, runway, mechanics, more pilots, fuel, and parts. The missing piece was funding. Townsend successfully solicited several wealthy evangelicals including the son and heir of Quaker Oats founder Henry P. Crowell. The project also received many smaller gifts from civic organizations, churches and individuals, and thus JAARS was born.

== Later life ==
On December 2, 1970, Townsend met and was photographed with President Nixon and Senator Carl Curtis.

== Bibliography ==
- Hugh Steven: Wycliffe in the Making: The Memoirs of W. Cameron Townsend, 1920-1933 (Wheaton, Harold Shaw 1995).
- Ruth A. Tucker: From Jerusalem to Irian Jaya: A Biographical History of Christian Missions (Zondervan ), ISBN 0-310-23937-0, p. 376f.
- Virginia Garrard-Burnett: A History of Protestantism in Guatemala: Living in the New Jerusalem (University of Texas Press), ISBN 0-292-72817-4.
- Larry Ziegler-Otero: Resistance in an Amazonian Community: Huaorani Organizing Against the Global Economy (Berghahn Books), ISBN 1-57181-448-5, p. 52ff.
- James C. and Marti Hefley: Uncle Cam: The Story of William Cameron Townsend (Hodder & Stoughton Ltd. 1975)
- Janet and Geoff Benge: "Cameron Townsend: Good news in every language" (YWAM 2000)
- Wallis, Ethel E.; Bennett, Mary A. (1964) [1959]. Two Thousand Tongues to Go: the story of the Wycliffe Bible translators. Harper & Row.
- William Cameron Townsend: The Truth about Mexico's Oil (SIL 1940).
