= Instituto Lingüístico de Verano (Mexico) =

Non-profit organization in Mexico

The Instituto Lingüístico de Verano A.C. (abbreviated ILV, in English: Summer Institute of Linguistics (in Mexico)) is a non-profit organization incorporated in Mexico with the legal status of a civil association (Asociación Civil). It is the affiliate body in Mexico to the overarching parent organization SIL Global, a worldwide U.S.-based evangelical Protestant organization that sponsors the study, documentation and development of indigenous and minority languages across the world. ILV in Mexico was formally established in 1948, with a stated focus on the study and documentation of the indigenous languages of Mexico and involvement with Mexico's indigenous peoples' affairs generally. The Institute publishes dictionaries, grammars and other literacy and education materials in many of the indigenous languages, and it is also a sponsor of language workshops, presentations and conferences. As a body with ongoing degrees of association and sponsorship of Christian missionary activities and goals, ILV also works to produce translations of Biblical texts in local languages.

While its work in linguistics and cultural anthropology has been lauded and recognized as substantial and positive contributions in many quarters, some of the ILV's activities have also attracted criticism and controversy with a number of anthropologists and other commentators severely criticizing its relations with Evangelical proselytism, and also alleging political involvement, pro-U.S. stance and acculturation policies.
