= Bottom Wood =

English nature reserve

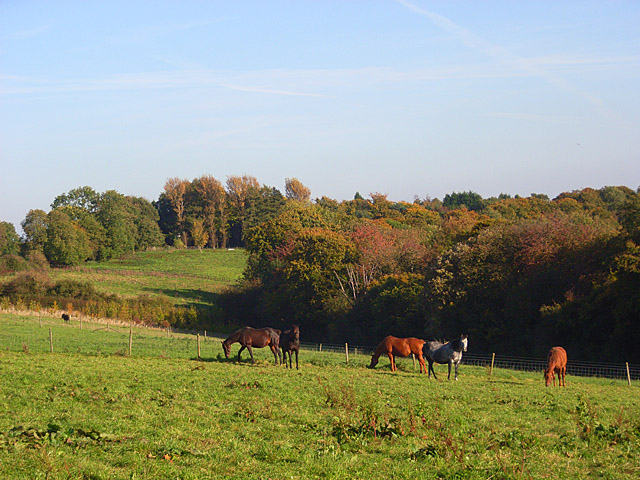
- Bottom Wood from an adjacent hillside

- Location within Buckinghamshire
- Interactive map of Bottom Wood

Geography
- Location: Buckinghamshire, England
- OS grid: SU795950
- Coordinates: 51.654°N 0.851°W
- Area: 14.5 hectares (36 acres)

Bottom Wood is a 14.5-hectare (36-acre) woodland in the English county of Buckinghamshire, located just north of the A40 near the hamlet of Studley Green. Since 1984, the wood has been owned by the Chiltern Society, which manages it as a nature reserve with the help of volunteers. Although an ancient woodland, most of the trees in the wood date from the end of the 1940s or later, as much of the wood was felled during the Second World War to produce Bryant and May matches. The wood is now home to a diverse range of flora and fauna, including rare species of butterfly and moth.

== Geography ==
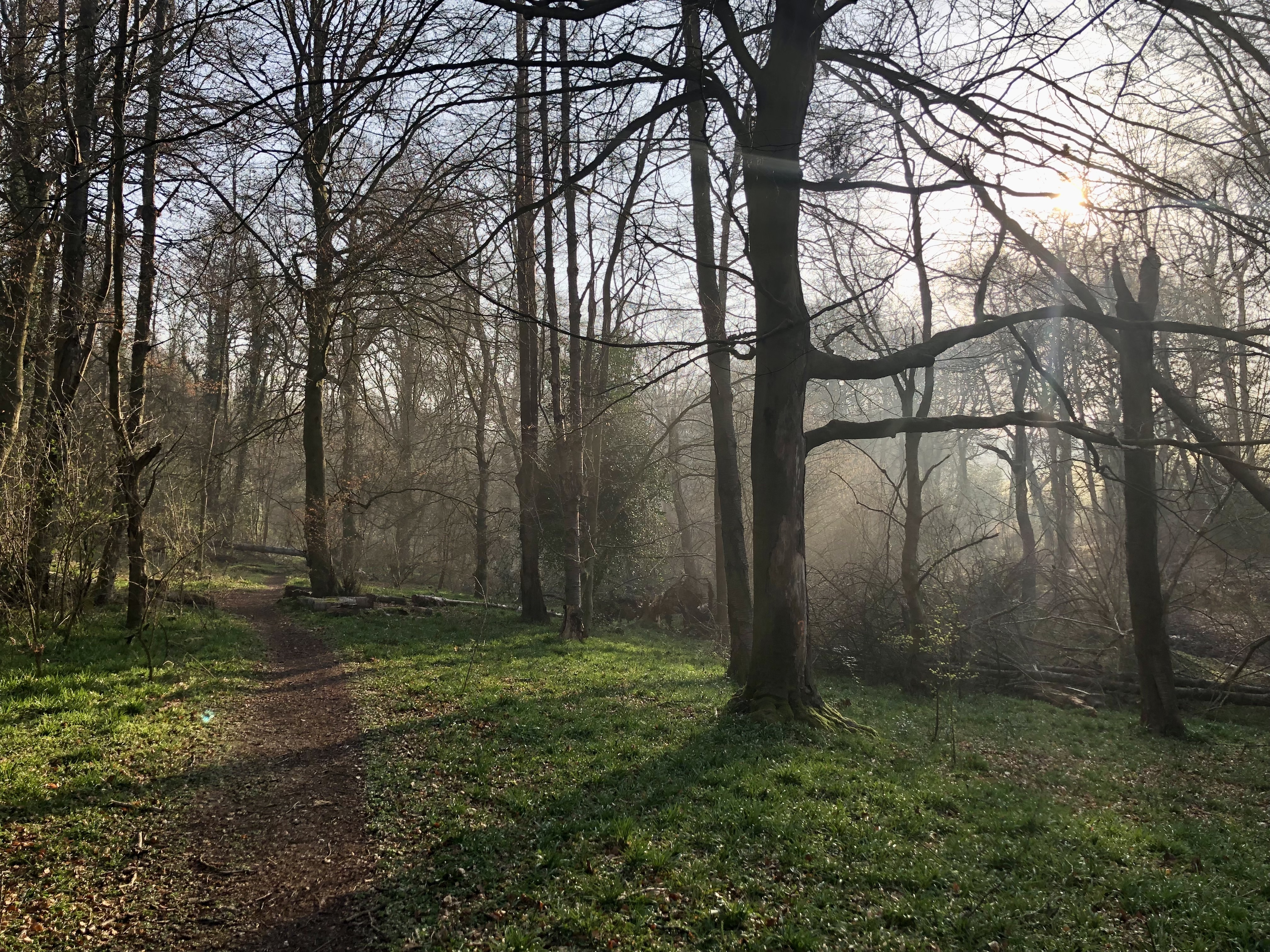
Bottom wood in the spring

Bottom Wood is located north of the A40 between Piddington and Stokenchurch, north-east of Studley Green and east of Beacon's Bottom. It is within the parish of Radnage, with the southern boundary meeting the border of Stokenchurch parish and the eastern edge meeting the boundary with West Wycombe parish. The southern boundary of the wood also used to mark the border between the counties of Buckinghamshire and Oxfordshire, until county lines were redrawn in 1896.

The wood is in a valley, with trees covering the south-facing valley slope. The elevation ranges from 132 metres (433 ft) above sea level to 162 metres (531 ft) above sea level. The wood covers a crescent-shaped area of 14.5 hectares (36 acres); the original wood is 11.5 hectares (28 acres), and there is a newer plantation of 3 hectares (7 acres) on an area known as Toothill. The name Toothill comes from the Old English word tot, which means 'look-out', and the top of Toothill provides a good view across the valley in which Bottom Wood is situated. Typically for the Chilterns, chalk underlies the wood, with some clay and sand.

There is a central bridleway running through the wood, which formerly provided a route for packhorses carrying goods between Piddington and Oxford, via Beacon's Bottom. A sewer now runs underground along this route, taking waste away from Beacon's Bottom.

== History ==
The main part of Bottom Wood is ancient woodland, (Note: The term "ancient woodland" in the UK refers to woodlands that have existed continuously since at least 1600.) although it is not known exactly how long the area has been wooded. Medieval documents show that the area was owned by the French Abbey of Fontrevaud, from the 12th century until 1413, when the land was returned to the Crown. The land was later given to Sir John Phillip and remained in the family for several years before coming under the ownership of Eton College and then the Earl of Caernarvon. It subsequently passed through several other hands, until it was acquired by John Scrope, owner of Wormsley Park, in 1737. The wood continued to be part of this estate until the 1930s. A tithe map from 1841 is the first known document naming the woodland as Bottom Wood; at this time, the eastern section of the wood was known as Dean Hook.

In the early 20th century, while the woodland was still part of the Wormsley estate, timber from Bottom Wood was sold each year at the King's Arms, Stokenchurch. Evidence of some of the saw pits, over which trees were cut into planks, can still be found in the wood. During a serious drought in 1921, the well in the wood proved to be an important feature, as it offered drinking water to local villagers when their personal water supplies ran dry. The well, which is now topped with concrete, is 30 metres (98 ft) deep and provided a constant supply even in periods of drought. In the mid-1930s, the wood was sold to Mr Pitcher. During the Second World War, much of the wood was felled for the production of Bryant and May matches. Consequently, most of the trees in the wood date from the late 1940s or later, except for a few in the north of the wood. After the war, various species began to grow again in the woods, including cherry, beech and oak trees.

In the 1950s, Mr Pitcher sold the wood to Mr Deane. Helped by the local scout troop, Mr Deane planted the adjoining field of Toothill, at the south-east end of the wood, with Sitka spruce and Scots pine trees. At the eastern edge of the wood, he also introduced some Douglas firs. Mrs Ercolani later bought the wood and managed it as a nature reserve, although much of the wood was untended and deteriorated during this time.

"We entered the wood from the Beacon's Bottom end. It was very scrubby with collapsing hazel and thorns with a bit of rubbish, including the remains of an old car at the entrance...The old beech wood was very dark with almost no ground vegetation. Lads on scramble bikes had worn a track up and down the hill over the old strip field system".

— John Morris from the Chiltern Society, examining the wood in 1983.

In 1984, the wood was given to the Chiltern Society, which had recently set up a Small Woodlands Project (later renamed the Chiltern Woodlands Project) in an attempt to reverse the decline of small woodlands in the Chilterns. This project was overseen by Chairman Charles Mills and Project Officer John Morris. Bottom Wood was chosen as a site in which to train those working in the project in good woodland management methods. The three broad aims of the project were to encourage the growth and planting of trees native to the area, to improve the overall quality of trees in the wood, and to manage the wood as a nature reserve.

A small team managed by the Chiltern Society began working in the wood in September 1983, spending an initial ten-week period clearing the bridleway through the wood, getting rid of rubbish that had accumulated under previous owners, and felling some trees in an attempt to encourage the growth of healthier specimens. This included a complete felling of 0.5 hectares (1.2 acres) of the Toothill plantation, which was replanted with 350 trees consisting mainly of ash, cherry, beech and whitebeam. Volunteers continued working to improve the quality of the wood in subsequent years, with some timber being sold to local businesses to fund the management project. Further selective felling took place, including in 1989 when further trees were removed in the Toothill section of the wood, with a central section of 0.5 ha remaining unplanted to form a chalk glade.

== Present use ==
Bottom Wood is currently still owned by the Chiltern Society and managed as a nature reserve by volunteers from the Society's Bottom Wood Group, in conjunction with the Chiltern Woodlands Project. It is open to the public, and can be accessed via Old Dashwood Hill in Studley Green, with some car parking available on the road. Since 2010, the wood has been used by Mary Towerton School as part of a forest school educational programme.

== Wildlife ==
Bottom Wood is a diverse environment which is home to over 700 plant and animal species. Formal cataloguing of some of these species has taken place, including research into the wood's plants by a PhD student, and a record of moths started in 1993.

=== Flora ===
Bottom Wood supports a wide variety of plants, due to the range of soil acidity and moisture levels across the woodland area. Rare flora includes coralroot bittercress (Cardamine bulbifera) and yellow bird's-nest. The wood is particularly known for its Hyacinthoides non-scripta ('common' or 'English' bluebells). The shrub layer is predominantly hazel. There are also a wide range of trees in the wood, including cherry, oak, ash and beech, yew and hornbeam.

=== Fauna ===
The wood is home to at least 25 different species of butterfly, which are particularly found in the area of open grassland in the Toothill section. Three rare species have been sighted, namely the grizzled skipper, the small blue and the white-letter hairstreak. The Duke of Burgundy was also recorded in the wood in 1989. 251 different moth species have been recorded in the wood, including five species classified as 'nationally notable b', meaning that they have been recorded in less than 4% of Great Britain. These species are Drepana cultraria, Paradarisa consonaria, Paradarisa extersaria, Cerastis leucographa and Lithophane hepatica.

Dormice are present in the wood, and are carefully monitored as a protected species. Red kites are frequently seen in the area, as are other rare bird species such as lesser spotted woodpeckers and marsh tits. A red deer was also once sighted in the wood.

As with other Chiltern woodlands, trees in Bottom Wood have been damaged by the introduced grey squirrel stripping their bark. Management measures are in place to control the squirrel population.
