= Waterend, Buckinghamshire =

Hamlet in Buckinghamshire, England

Coordinates: 51.66°N 00.87°W

Waterend
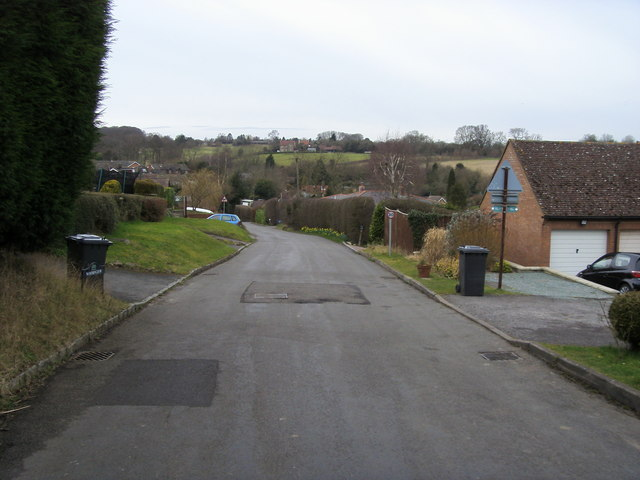
- Waterend Road, 2008

- Location within Buckinghamshire
- OS grid reference: SU7894
- Unitary authority: Buckinghamshire
- Ceremonial county: Buckinghamshire
- Region: South East
- Country: England
- Sovereign state: United Kingdom
- Post town: HIGH WYCOMBE
- Postcode district: HP14
- Police: Thames Valley
- Fire: Buckinghamshire
- Ambulance: South Central

Waterend is a hamlet located on the A40 between Piddington and Stokenchurch in Buckinghamshire, England. Together with the adjacent hamlets of Horsleys Green, Beacon's Bottom and Studley Green, it is in an area known collectively as 'Studley Green'. It is within the Chiltern Area of Outstanding Natural Beauty.

It featured in a 1987 episode of the BBC motoring magazine show Top Gear, which looked at safety on rural roads. Waterend was chosen for the abnormally high accident rate in both the hamlet itself and the surrounding roads.
