= Horsleys Green =

Hamlet in Buckinghamshire, England

Coordinates: 51.65°N 00.86°W

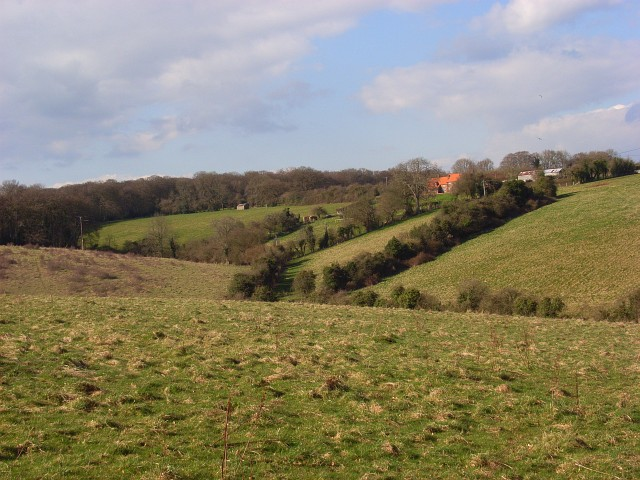
- Pastures, Horsleys Green, 2006

- Location within Buckinghamshire
- OS grid reference: SU7894
- Unitary authority: Buckinghamshire
- Ceremonial county: Buckinghamshire
- Region: South East
- Country: England
- Sovereign state: United Kingdom
- Post town: HIGH WYCOMBE
- Postcode district: HP14
- Dialling code: 01494
- Police: Thames Valley
- Fire: Buckinghamshire
- Ambulance: South Central
- UK Parliament: Wycombe

Horsleys Green (often incorrectly referred to as Horsley's Green) is a hamlet located on the A40 between Piddington and Stokenchurch in Buckinghamshire, England. It consists of a few houses situated either side of a narrow lane.

== Geography ==
Horsleys Green is located about 2 miles east of the village of Stokenchurch, in a group of four hamlets either side of the A40 known collectively as 'Studley Green' - the other three hamlets are Beacon's Bottom, Studley Green and Waterend. It lies amongst woodland, within the Chiltern Area of Outstanding Natural Beauty: to the north is Third's Wood, with Fillington Wood to the east and Watercroft Wood and Dell's Wood to the south.

== History ==
Settlement at Horsleys Green dates back to at least the seventeenth century, with some of these properties, such as Old Beckings and Horsleys Green Manor, still in use today. It was originally known as Ostlers Green, which suggests there may have been stables connected with the settlement (Ostlers being an archaic word for stablemen). The Captains Pond, which was located at the north of the hamlet, continued to provide refreshment to the horses of travellers staying at the Harrow, a nearby public house. By the 1880s, the name had changed to Horslers Green, and later it became Horsleys Green.

During the Second World War, a camp school for disabled evacuees from London was established in Horsleys Green, run by the government-formed National Camps Corporation. After the war, such camp schools were offered for sale, and ownership of the school at Horsleys Green passed into the hands of Lancashire County Council in 1947. From April of that year the Lancashire Education Committee ran an all-boys boarding school on the site. Initially, this school was known as Stokenchurch School, but the name changed to Horsley's Green School in 1950. (Note: The school did use the apostrophe in its title.)

In 1971, the grounds were acquired by Wycliffe Bible Translators, as 'Reasonable Equivalent Accommodation' for their previous base in Bletchingley, which was subject to a compulsory purchase order for the construction of the M23. Lancashire County Council had also had offers for the site from a government department, but Wycliffe's bid had been accepted by a majority of one vote. After taking possession on 8 November, Wycliffe expanded the site with additional wooden buildings bought from various sources, including Twickenham Grammar School. A few years later, in May 1975, the kitchen and dining room complex had to be rebuilt following a fire.

Wycliffe Bible Translators used the site as their UK headquarters until September 2013. Known as 'The Wycliffe Centre', the site served as a base for training in cross-cultural language work under the 'European Training Programme', and as a Christian conference centre with facilities for 160 guests. The buildings were named after individuals involved in Bible translation, such as William Carey, Henry Martyn and James O. Fraser. More recent buildings were built on the site since the 1970s: Tyndale and Aylward were built in the 1980s, and Bede followed in 1998.

== Landmarks ==
Old Beckings (formerly known as The Old House) is a Grade II listed house built in the 17th century. Horsleys Green Manor is also Grade II listed, with deeds dating back to 1630, although it was possibly built in the 16th century. The manor used to have cottages connected with the estate, and material from three of these cottages was used to extend the manor house. Originally, all of the windows were north-facing. The property suffered fire damage in 1948, but this was only minimal and contained to a small part of the building.

== Governance ==
Horsleys Green, together with the other hamlets in the Studley Green area, is within the civil parish of Stokenchurch and Buckinghamshire unitary district. Since 2024 it has been in the parliamentary constituency of Wycombe.

== Amenities ==
=== Public transport ===
There are local bus services from nearby in Studley Green to High Wycombe, Stokenchurch, Thame, Lane End, and other villages in between. These services are operated by Arriva Shires & Essex and Carousel Buses. The services are fairly frequent, although Arriva reduced their evening and Sunday services in May 2011.

=== Education ===
Wycliffe Bible Translators used to run a nursery school called Little Fishes Day Nursery at the Wycliffe Centre. This was originally started to provide care for children of linguistic students, but grew to accommodate 80 children from the local area. It closed in September 2005.
