= Studley Green =

Village in Buckinghamshire, England

Coordinates: 51.65°N 00.86°W

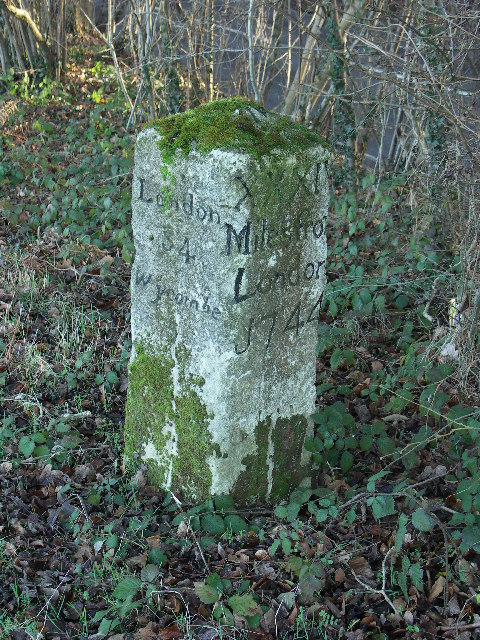
- 18th-century milestone at the junction of Old Dashwood Hill and the A40 Wycombe Road at Studley Green, near Stokenchurch, Buckinghamshire

- Location within Buckinghamshire
- OS grid reference: SU7894
- Unitary authority: Buckinghamshire
- Ceremonial county: Buckinghamshire
- Region: South East
- Country: England
- Sovereign state: United Kingdom
- Post town: HIGH WYCOMBE
- Postcode district: HP14
- Police: Thames Valley
- Fire: Buckinghamshire
- Ambulance: South Central

Studley Green is a hamlet located on the A40 between Piddington and Stokenchurch in Buckinghamshire, England. The term 'Studley Green' is also used to collectively refer to the four adjacent hamlets of Studley Green, Horsleys Green, Beacon's Bottom and Waterend.
