= Radnage War Memorial =

Radnage memorial ground for men who died during the 1st & 2nd World Wars

Coordinates: 51.66375°N 0.865822°W

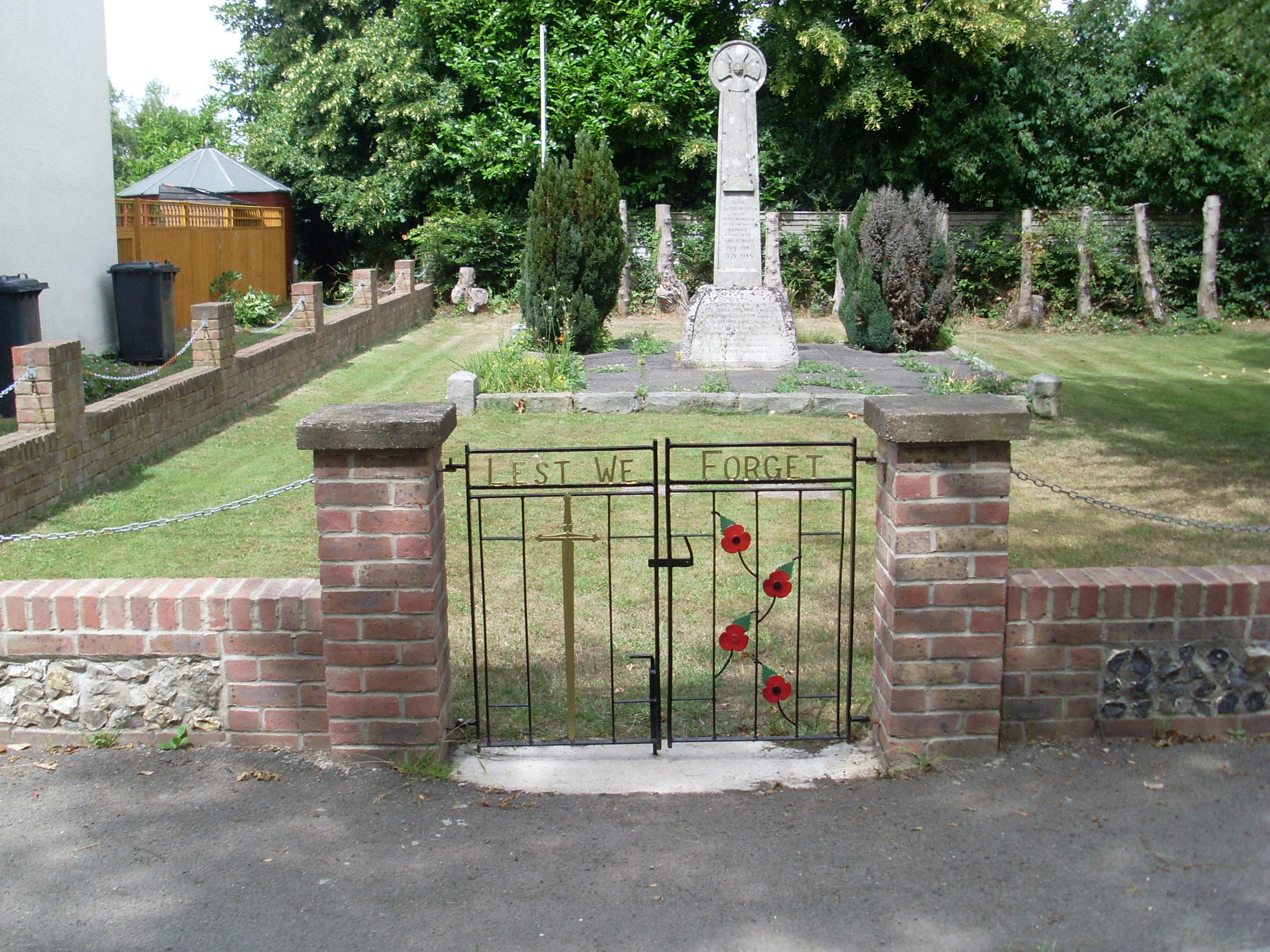
Radnage War Memorial

Radnage War Memorial is located at Mudds Bank, Radnage, Buckinghamshire, England. It is a grade II listed building with Historic England and commemorates the men of the village who died in the First and Second World Wars.
