= Radnage =

Village in Buckinghamshire, England

Coordinates: 51.668°N 0.870°W

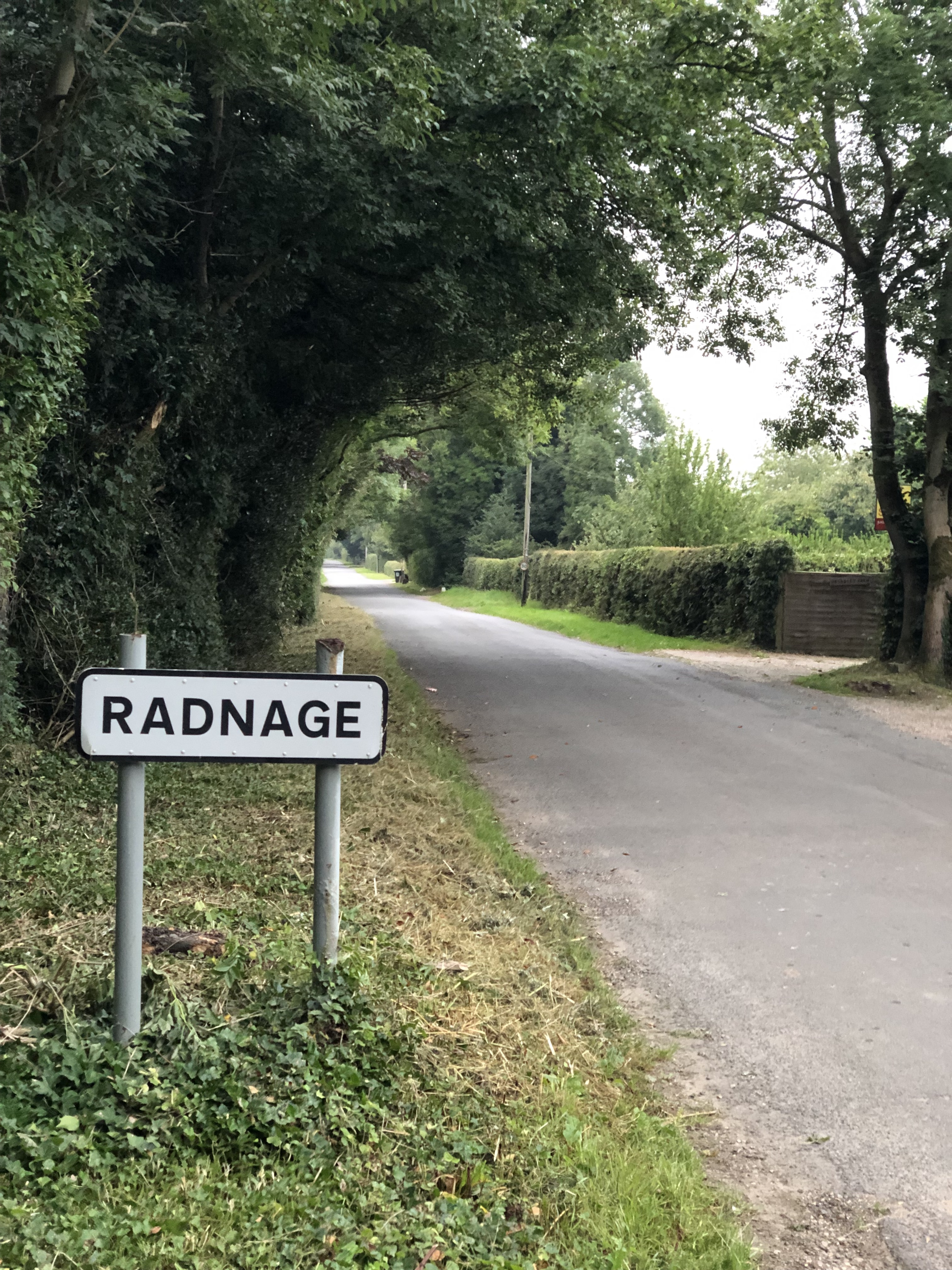
- Entrance to Radnage, Sprigs Holly Lane

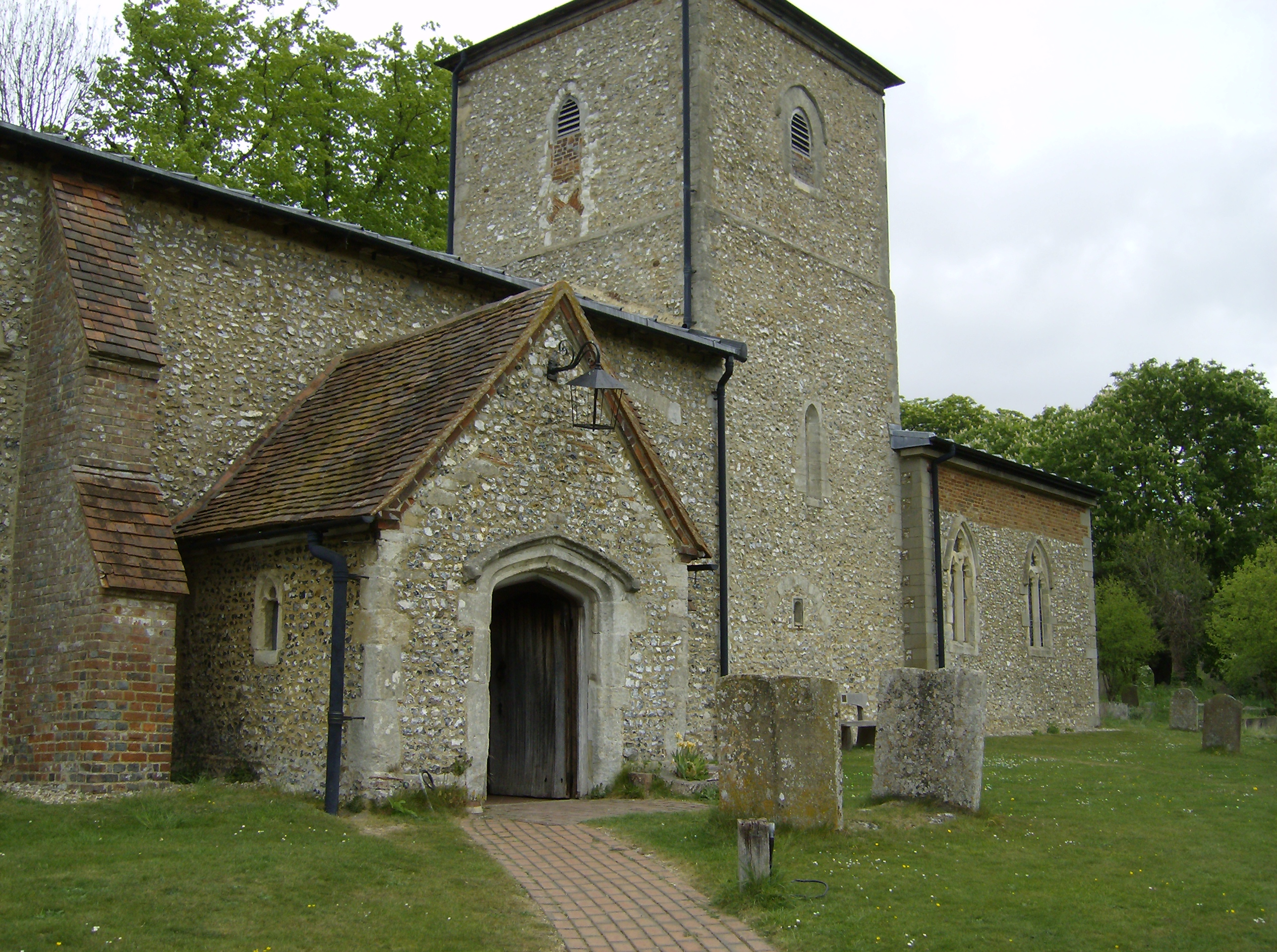
- St. Mary's parish Church

- Location within Buckinghamshire
- Population: 658; 673 (2011 census)
- OS grid reference: SU7897
- Civil parish: Radnage
- Unitary authority: Buckinghamshire
- Ceremonial county: Buckinghamshire
- Region: South East
- Country: England
- Sovereign state: United Kingdom
- Post town: High Wycombe
- Postcode district: HP14
- Dialling code: 01494
- Police: Thames Valley
- Fire: Buckinghamshire
- Ambulance: South Central
- UK Parliament: Wycombe
- Website: Radnage

Radnage is a village and civil parish in the Buckinghamshire district of Buckinghamshire, England. It is in the Chiltern Hills about two miles north east of Stokenchurch and six miles WNW of High Wycombe.

The parish is set in folds of the Chiltern Hills to the south of Bledlow Ridge next to the border with Oxfordshire. Although not a large parish, the residential areas known as The City, Bennett End and Town End, are separate hamlets.

Radnage (also spelled Radeneach, Rodenache etc. in old documents) meant ‘red oak’ in Old English.

== History ==
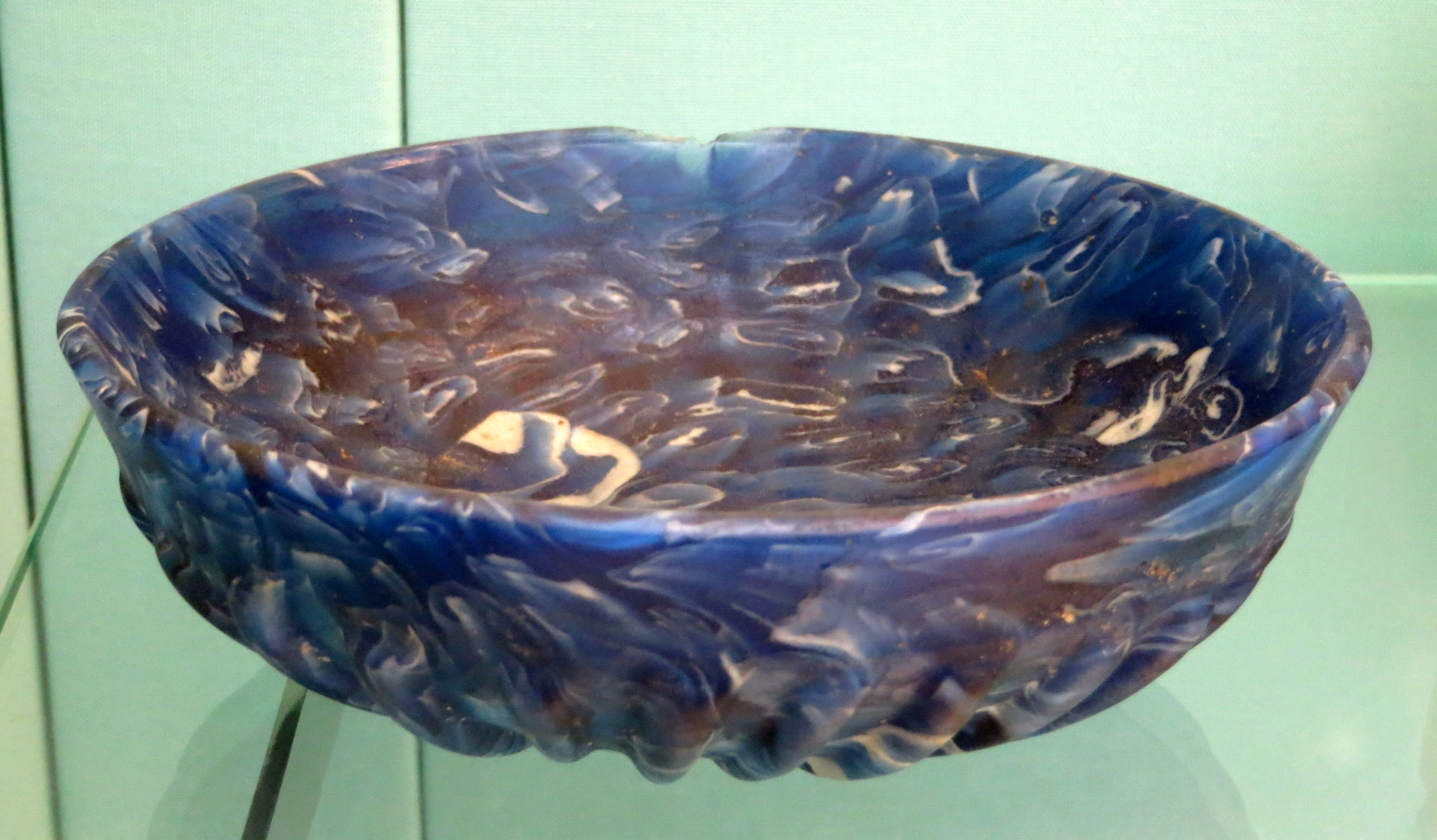
Roman ribbed bowl in the British Museum that was excavated in Radnage

Settlement in the area dates back to Roman times as demonstrated by the excavation of a Romano-British glass ribbed bowl from the village, now in the British Museum. Radnage is not mentioned in Domesday Book and it appears from a 13th-century document to have been royal demesne attached to the manor of Brill. Later, it was divided into two parts. The smaller part was granted by King Henry I to the newly established Fontevrault Abbey in France and attached to property at Leighton in Bedfordshire, which was also given to Fontevrault.

The larger part, known as Radnage Manor, was for a time retained by the crown and then in 1215 was granted by King John to the Knights Templar. When this order was suppressed in the early 14th century, their lands passed to the Knights Hospitaller. On the Dissolution of the Monasteries by King Henry VIII the manor was again acquired by the crown. King Charles I mortgaged it with other crown lands to the City of London in order to raise money. Later, King Charles II was said to have given it to one of his mistresses. But by the 19th century both parts of the manor again belonged to the crown and so remained until the abolition of manorial rights in 1925.

Dedicated on 1 May 1920, Radnage War Memorial sits in a walled garden at Mudds Bank.

== Amenities ==
Radnage has two public houses: The Crown and the Mash Inn (previously known as the Three Horseshoes).

There is also a village hall, which is used as the meeting place for the parish council and W.I. In addition to this, the hall also has a playing field and separate children's playground.

The village also has two campsites: Bella Vista and Home Farm.

== Outdoor activities ==
Radnage is situated in the heart of the Chiltern Hills and is served by multiple footpaths and bridleways. As such, it's popular with cyclists, walkers, runners and horse riders. The village holds an annual 5k and 10k trail run race to raise money for the local school.

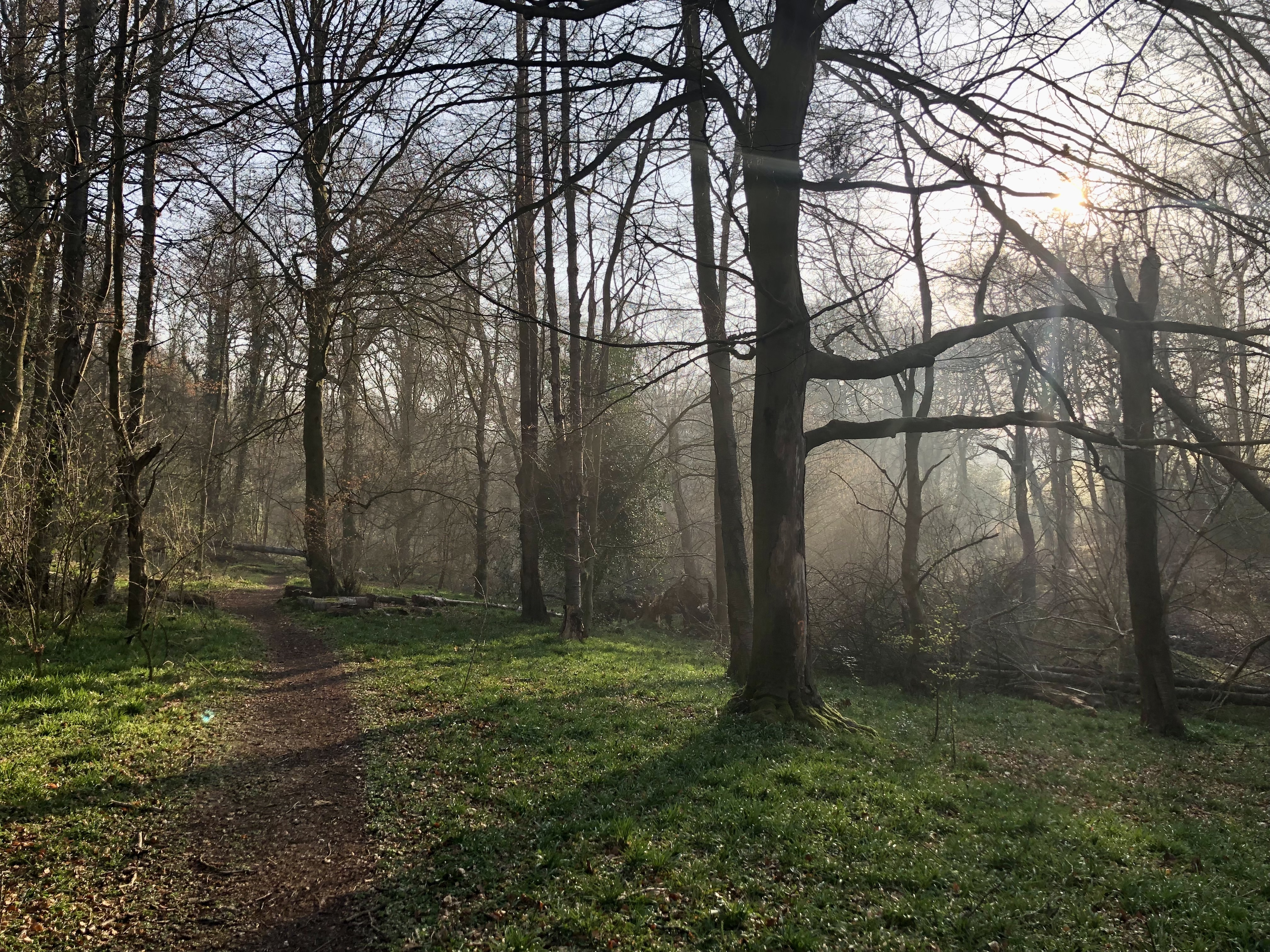
A view of Bottom Wood in the spring

=== Notable trails and locations ===
- Yoesden Nature Reserve, a chalk grassland bank with rare butterflies and wildflowers.
- Bottom Wood, a 35-acre ancient woodland and nature reserve
- Chiltern Way, 134 mile (215 km) walking loop through the Chilterns passes through the village
- Chilterns Cycle Way, 170 mile (273.5 km) circular route of the Chilterns AONB passes through the village

== Church of St Mary the Virgin ==
St Mary the Virgin is the local parish church, situated towards the northeastern edge of the parish. The church is part of the West Wycombe benefice, the building is Grade I listed.

=== History and construction ===
The church was built in the late 12th century, early 13th century in much the same form as it appears today, though larger windows were inserted in the 14th century and the nave appears to have been lengthened and heightened in the 15th century, when the present roof was built. There is a central tower, which is unusual in being narrower than either the chancel or the nave.

There are three original lancet windows of the early 13th century in the east wall of the chancel. The other windows in the church are 14th century. The south doorway is original of the early 13th century. A similar north doorway has been blocked up. The south porch and outer door are original of the 13th century, but with a 15th-century roof and 15th-century windows in the side walls.

The fine 15th-century nave roof has embattled tie-beams supported by arched brackets with tracery in the spandrels and also in the triangular spaces above the beams. The lower-pitched chancel roof is probably 16th century.

Inside the church there is an archway through the tower with 13th-century arches in pointed style at either end. The chancel has a 13th-century piscina (damaged) in the south wall. The nave has traces of early wall painting and also post-Reformation texts (16th-to-18th-century). The font is probably 17th-century.

Church of St Mary the Virgin
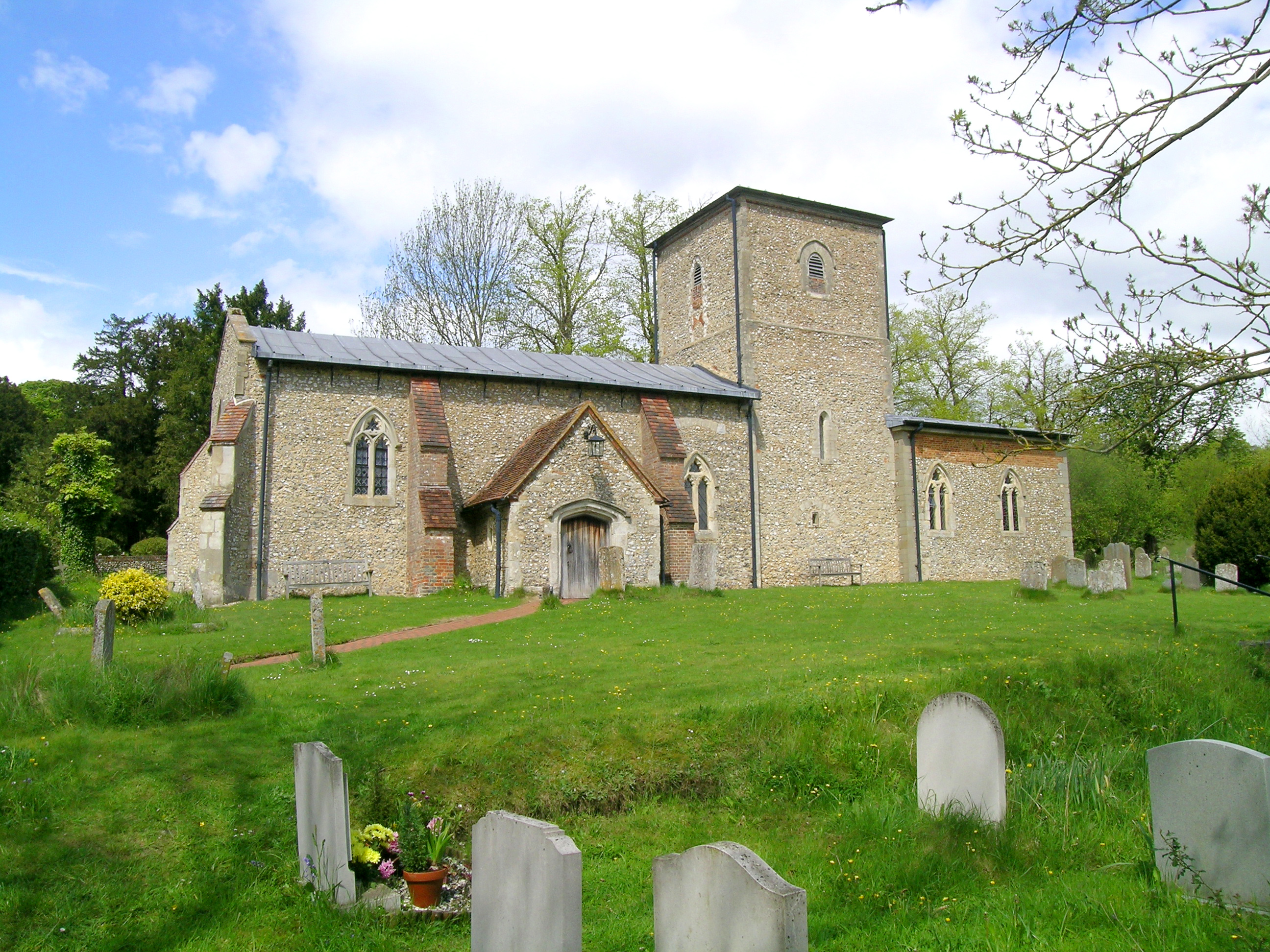
The church from the south

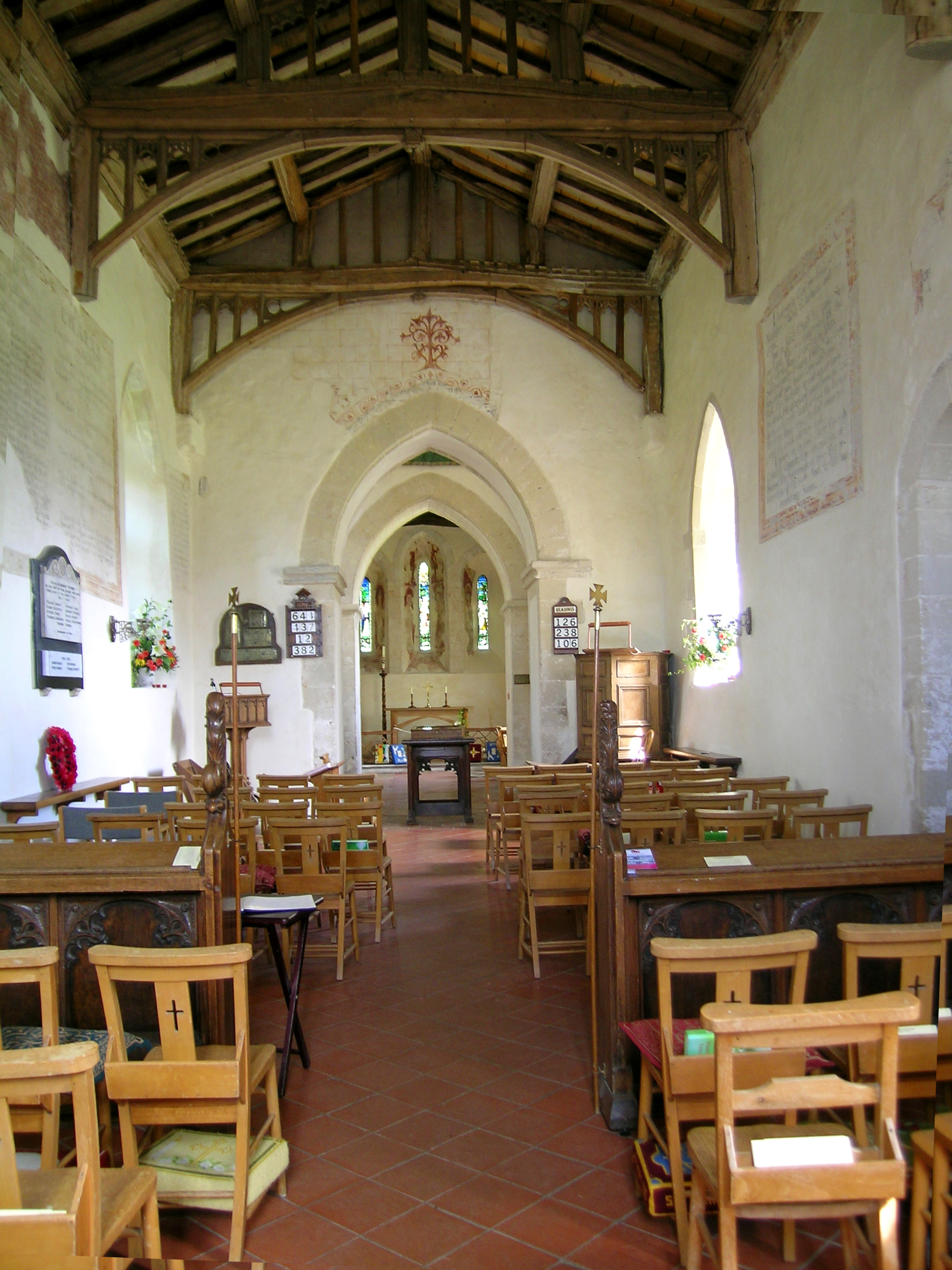
Interior of the church

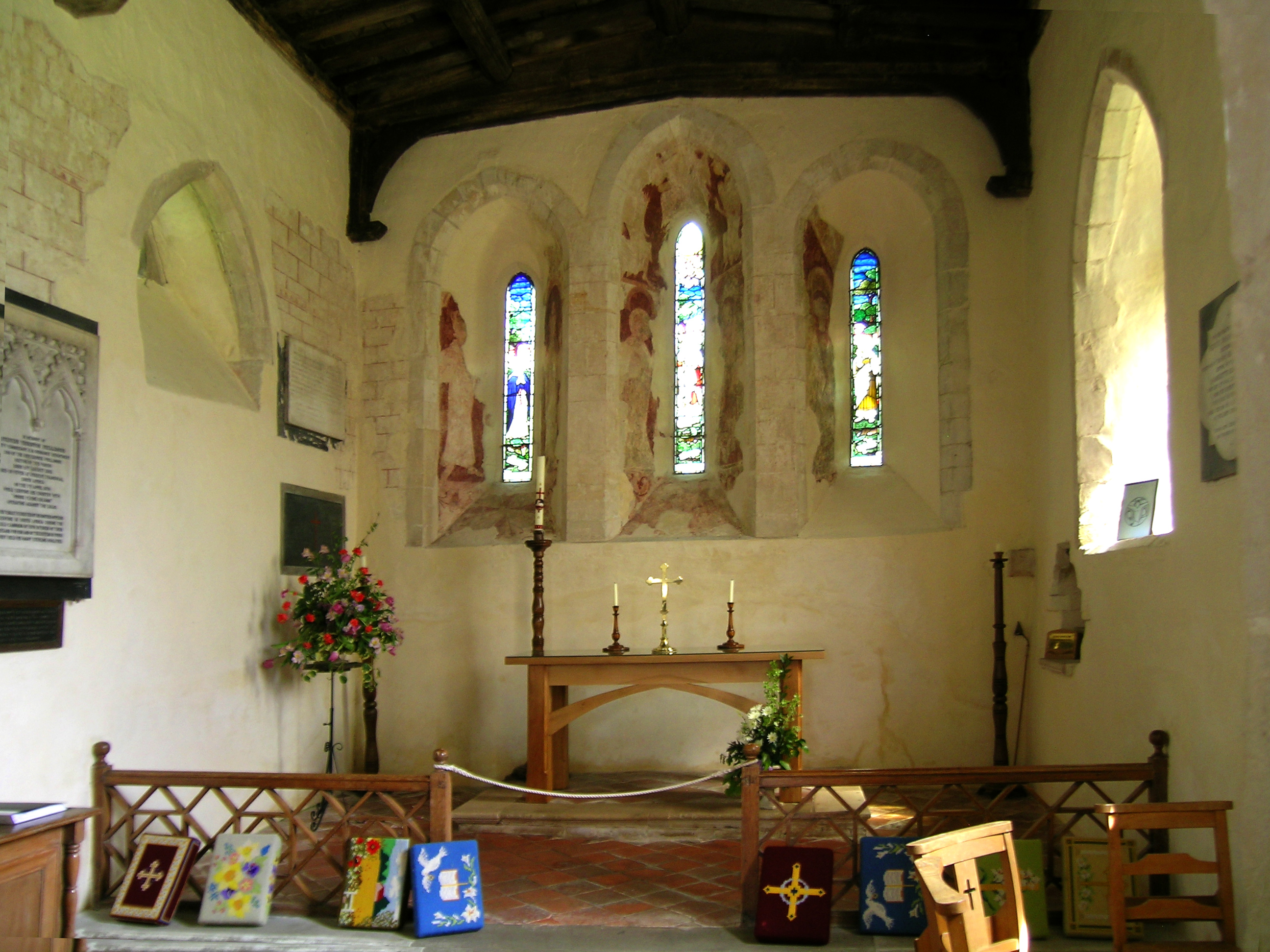
The chancel

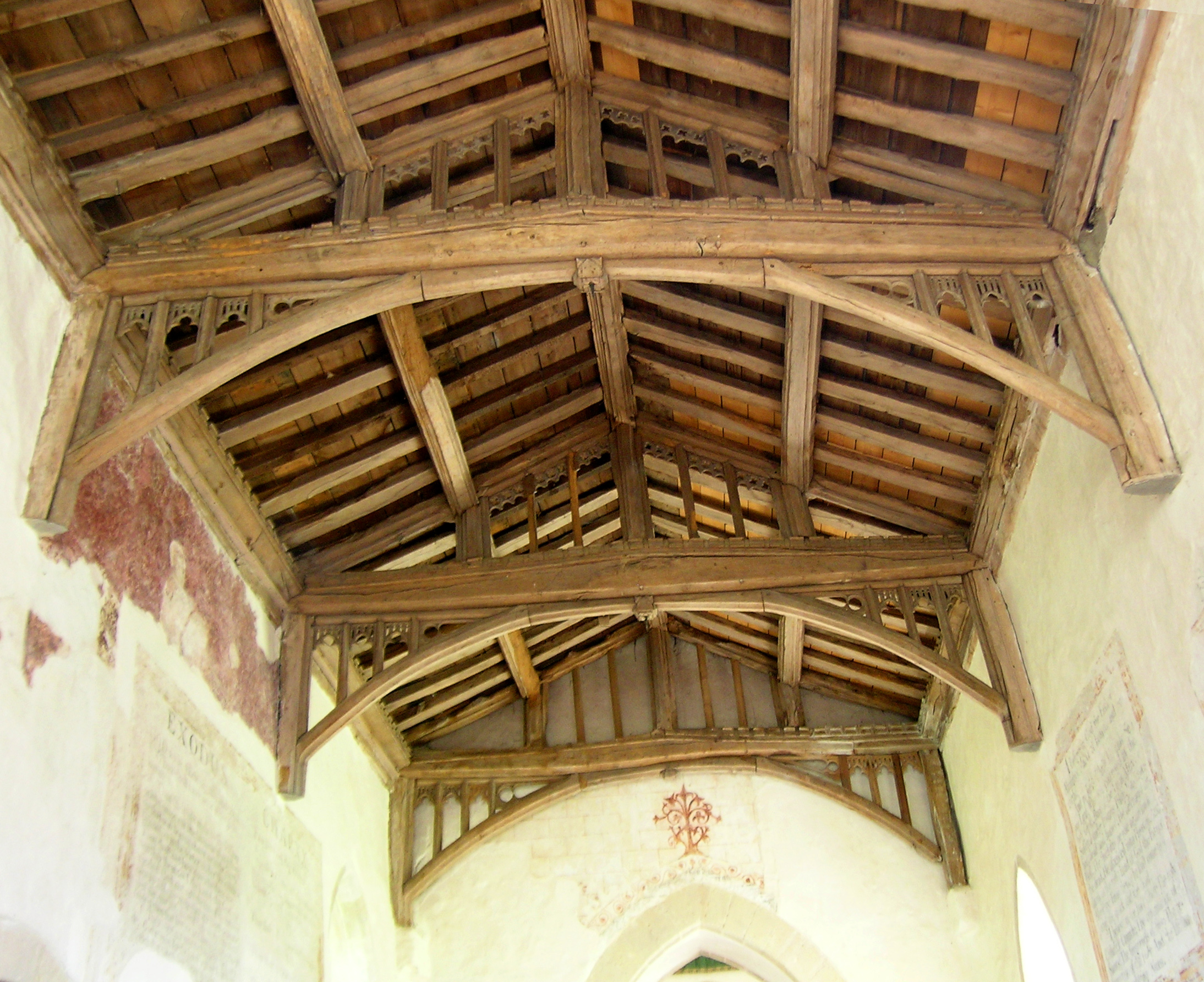
The 15th-century tie-beam roof

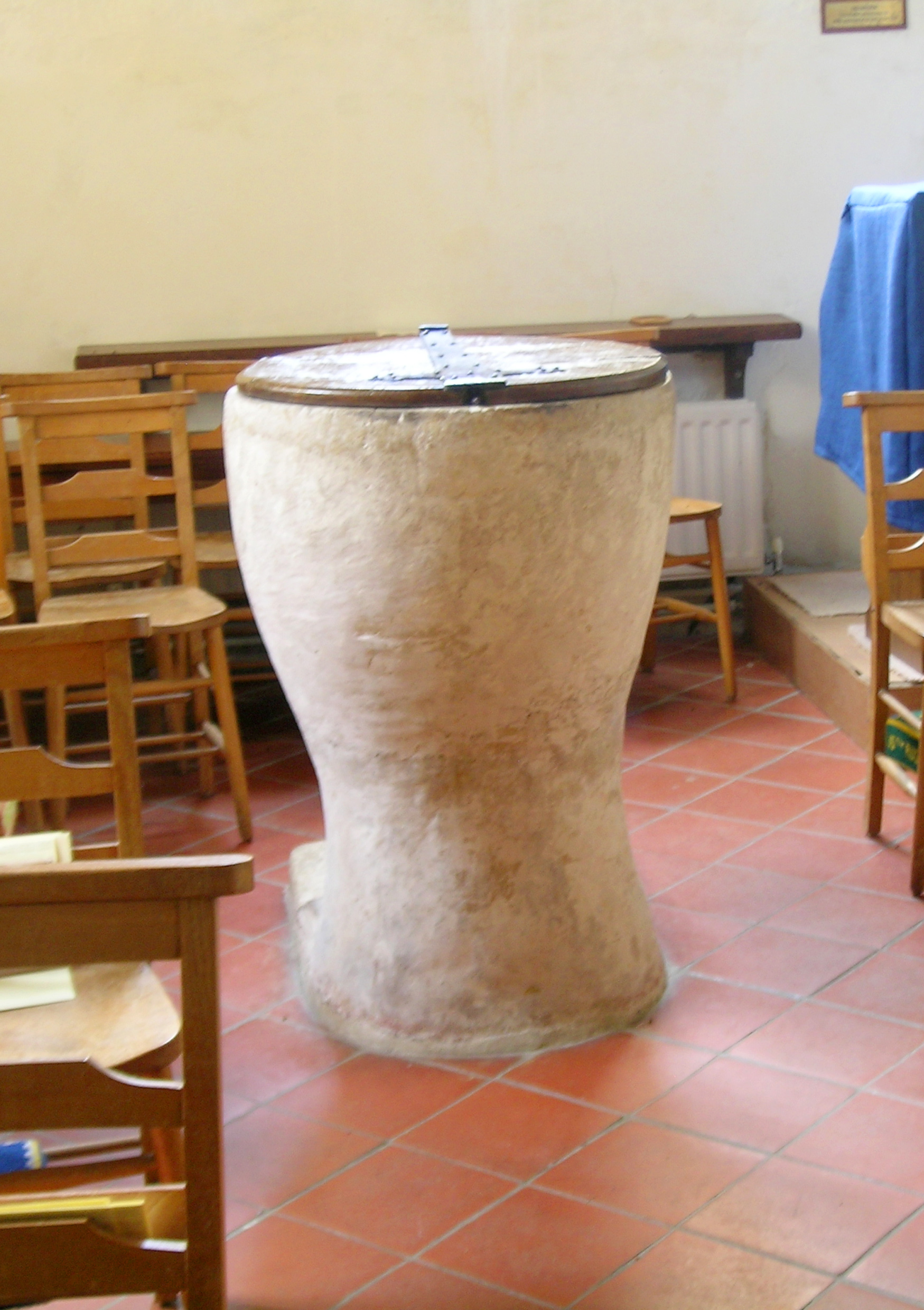
The font

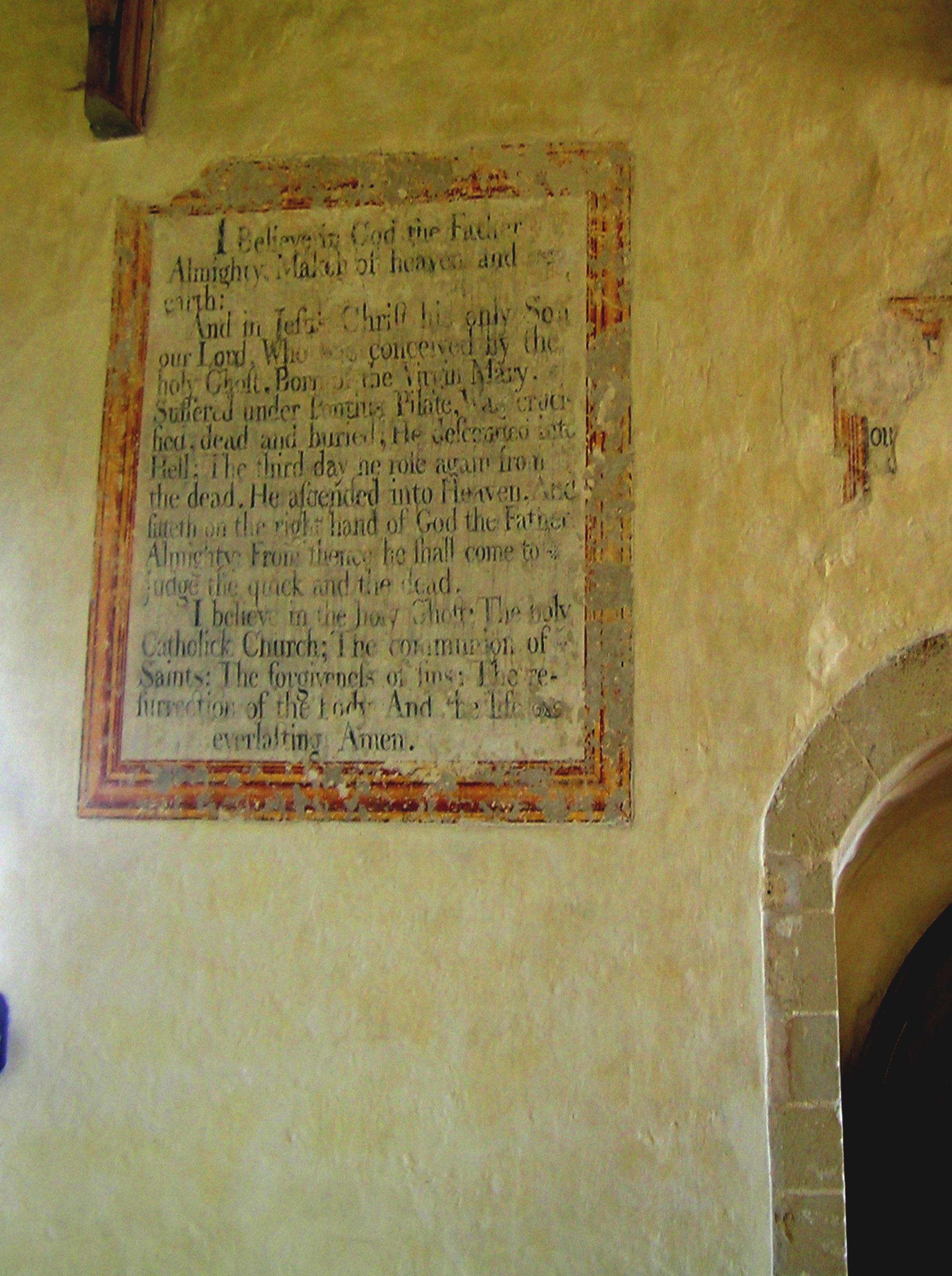
Wall painting of the Creed on south wall of nave
