= St Mary the Virgin, Radnage =

- St Mary the Virgin, Radnage
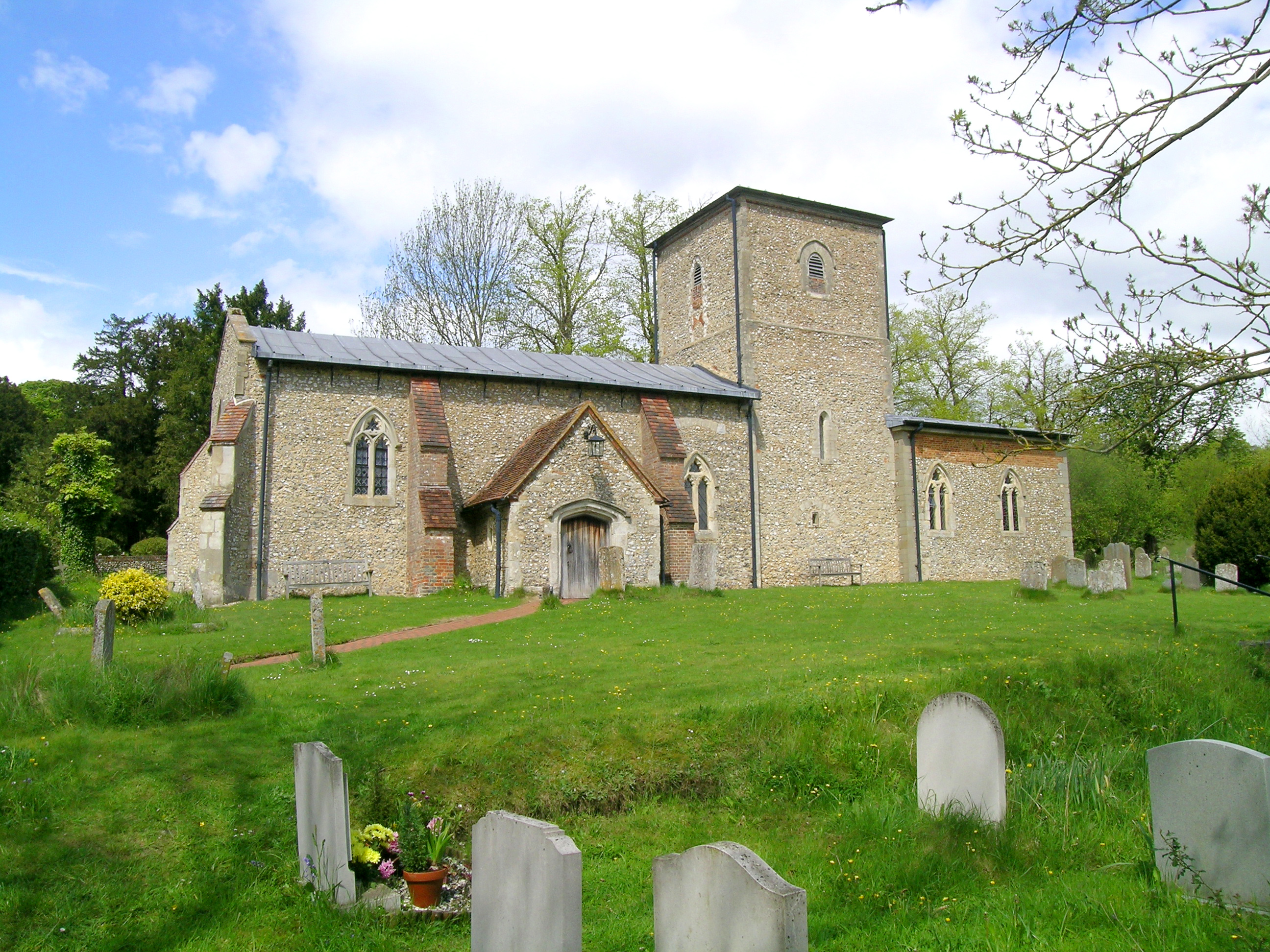
- The view from the south

- Location of St Mary the Virgin in Buckinghamshire
- 51.6748103°N 0.8646911°W
- Location: Radnage
- Country: England
- Denomination: Church of England
- Website: www.radnage.net/st-mary-the-virgin-radnage

History
- Dedication: St Mary the Virgin

Architecture
- Heritage designation: Grade I listed church
- Designated: 21 June 1955
- Architectural type: Flint with stone dressings and lead roofs

Administration
- Diocese: Diocese of Oxford
- Archdeaconry: Buckingham
- Deanery: Wycombe Deanery

St Mary the Virgin is the parish church of Radnage in Buckinghamshire, situated towards the northeastern edge of the village. The church is part of the West Wycombe benefice, the building is Grade I listed.

== History and construction ==
The church was built in the late 12th and early 13th centuries in much the same form as it appears today, though larger windows were inserted in the 14th century and the nave appears to have been lengthened and heightened in the 15th century when the present roof was built. There is a central tower, which is unusual in being narrower than either the chancel or the nave.

There are three original lancet windows of the early 13th century in the east wall of the chancel. The other windows in the church are 14th century. The south doorway is original of the early 13th century. A similar north doorway has been blocked up. The south porch and outer door are original of the 13th century, but with a 15th-century roof and 15th-century windows in the side walls.

The fine 15th-century nave roof has embattled tie-beams supported by arched brackets with tracery in the spandrels and also in the triangular spaces above the beams. The lower-pitched chancel roof is probably 16th century.

Inside the church there is an archway through the tower with 13th-century arches in pointed style at either end. The chancel has a 13th-century piscina (damaged) in the south wall. The nave has traces of early wall painting and also post-Reformation texts (16th-to-18th-century). The font is probably 17th-century.

== Filming ==
In 1986, St Mary's was used in the film A Month in the Country. The film is an adaptation of the 1980 novel of the same name by J. L. Carr, and starred Colin Firth, Kenneth Branagh, Natasha Richardson and Patrick Malahide.

The church, which is a main location for the film, was substantially set-dressed. Despite having several original medieval wall paintings, the largest addition was the creation of the medieval mural by artist Margot Noyes. To create the impression of an austere country church, Victorian stone flags were replaced with brick pavers for the duration of filming and the original wall paintings covered up. Plastic guttering and other modern additions were covered up or removed. The churchyard had several gravestones added, including the large box tomb which is a focus of several scenes.

There were some problems involving unwelcome damage to a section of the interior plasterwork, which had to be restored after filming had concluded.

Gallery
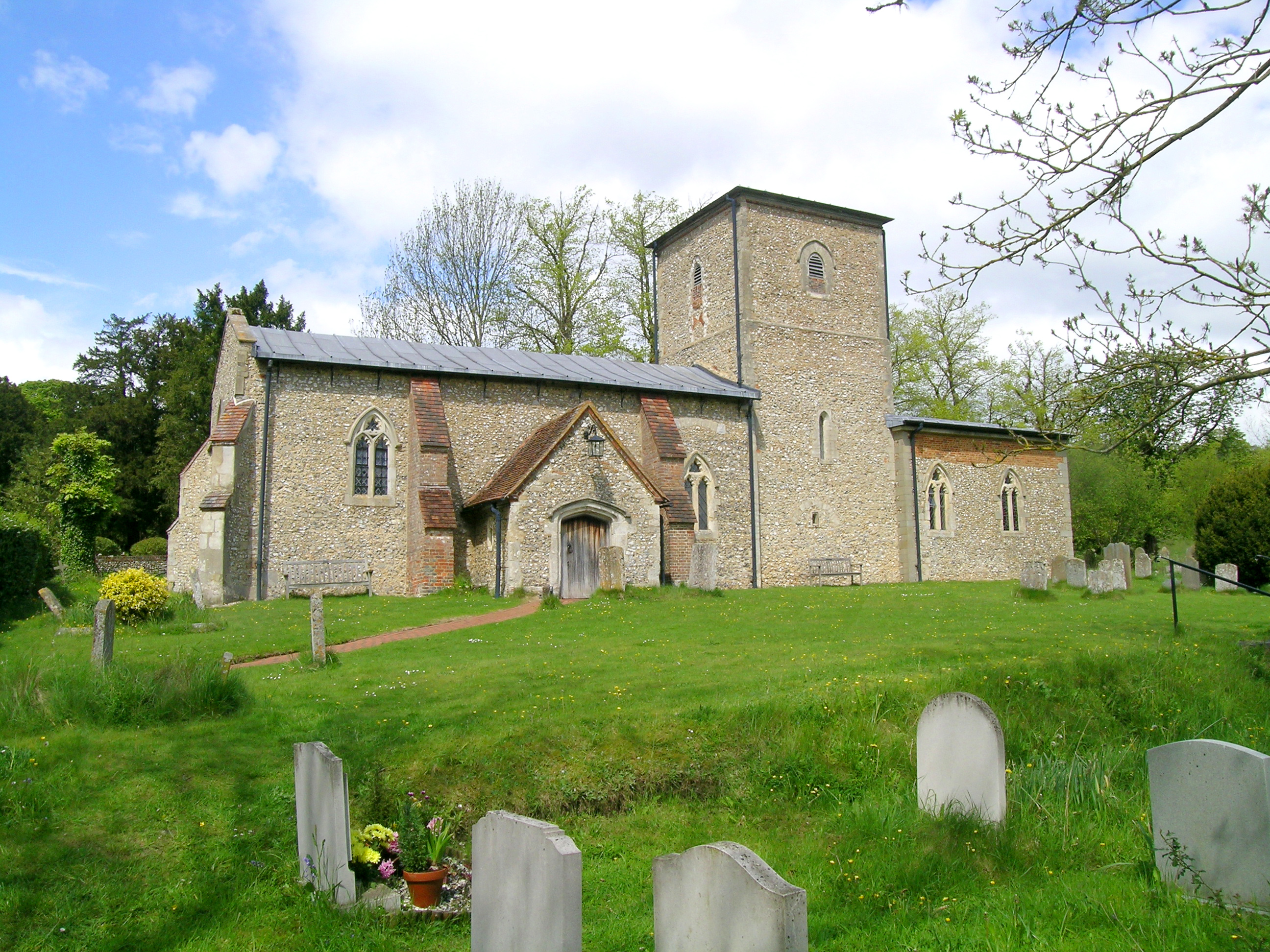
The church from the south

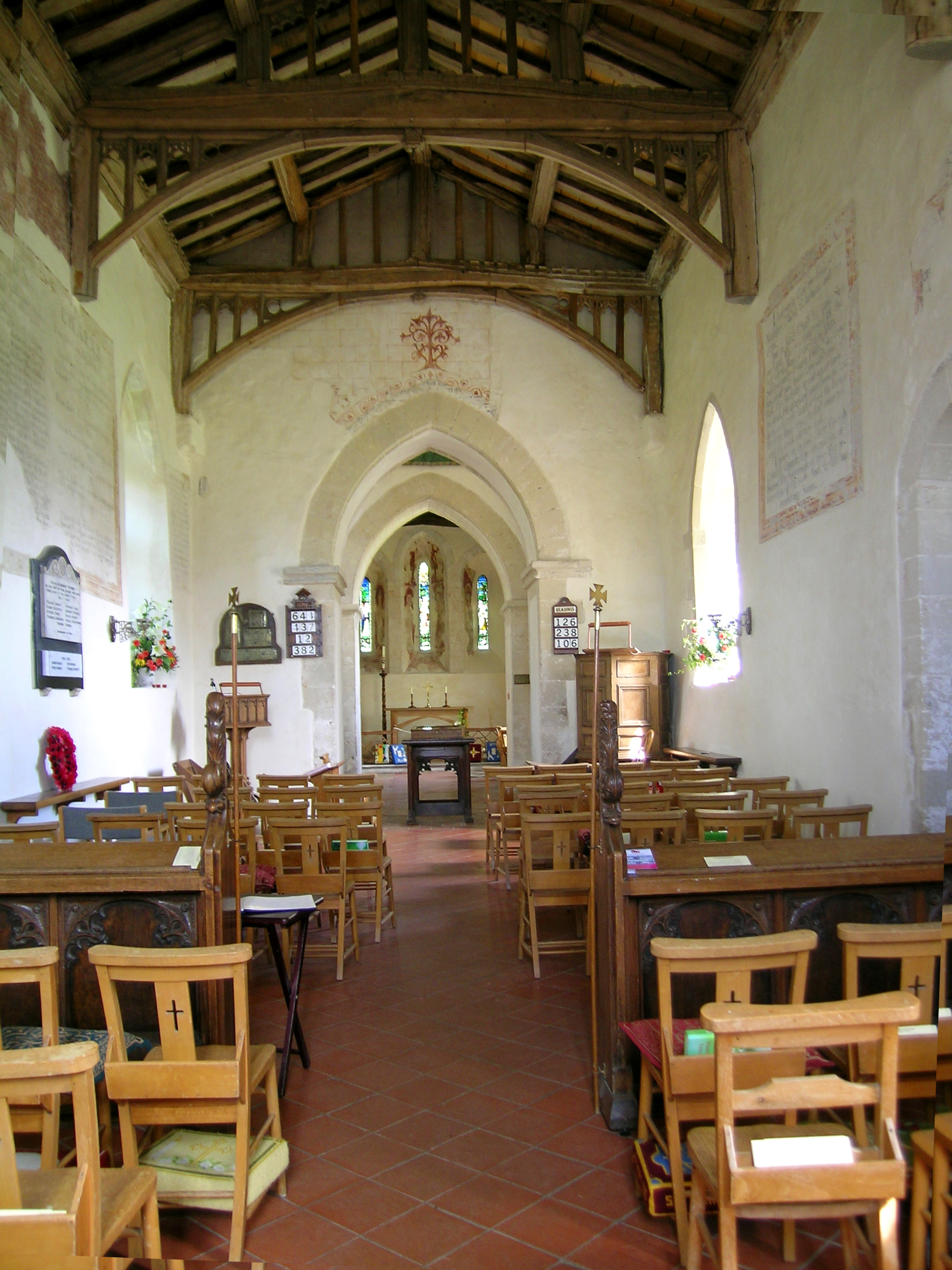
Interior of the church

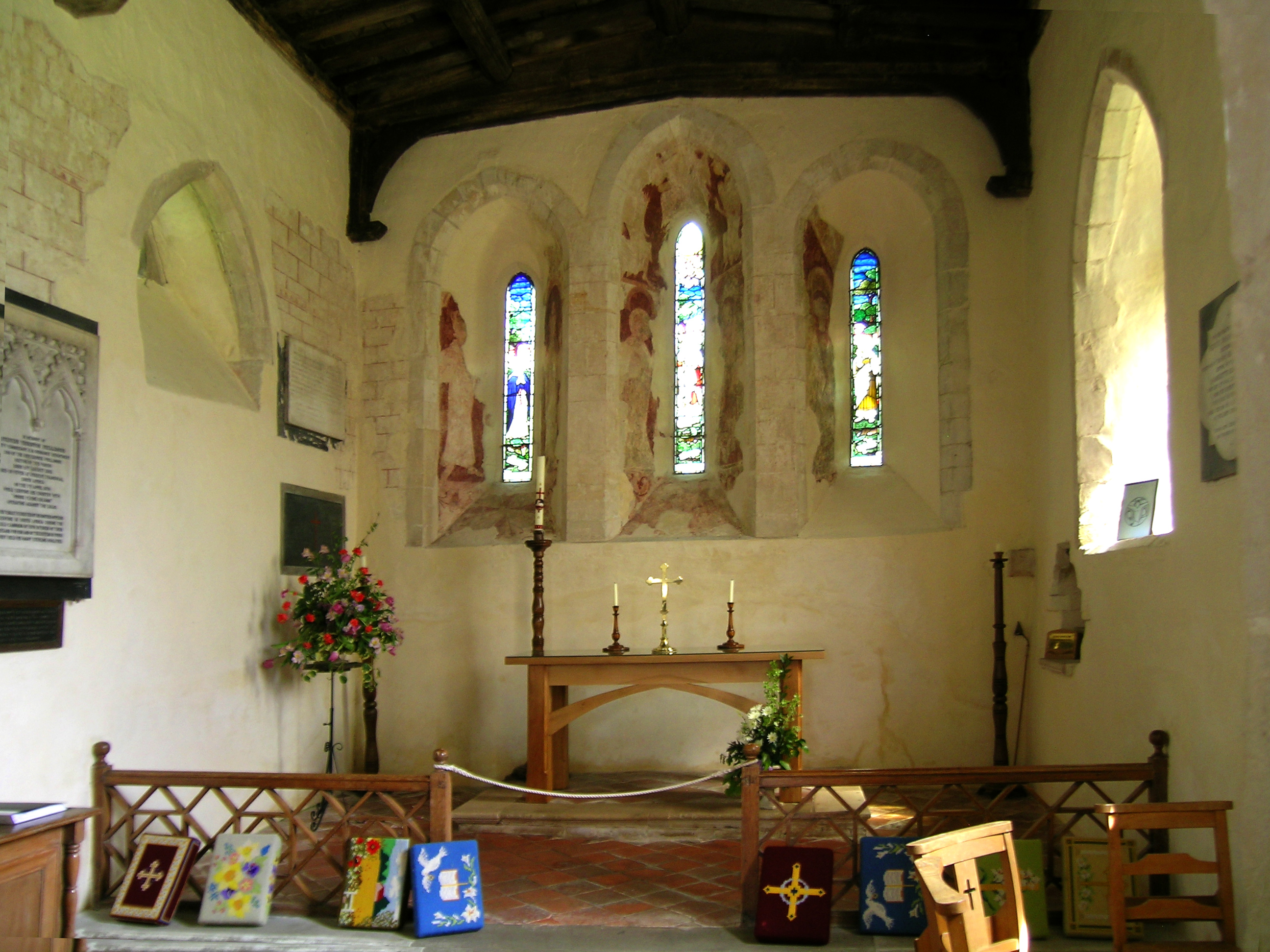
The chancel

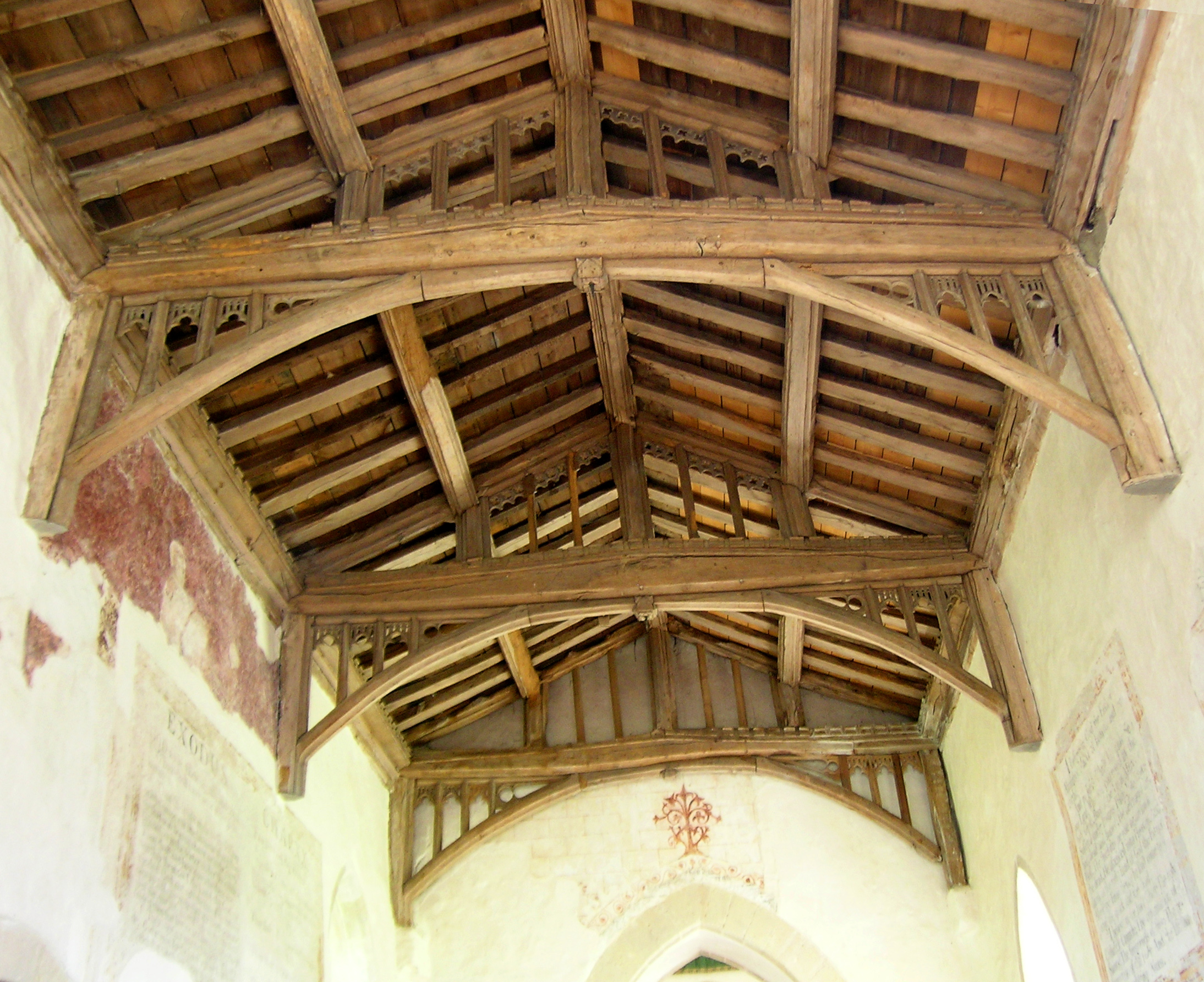
The 15th-century tie-beam roof

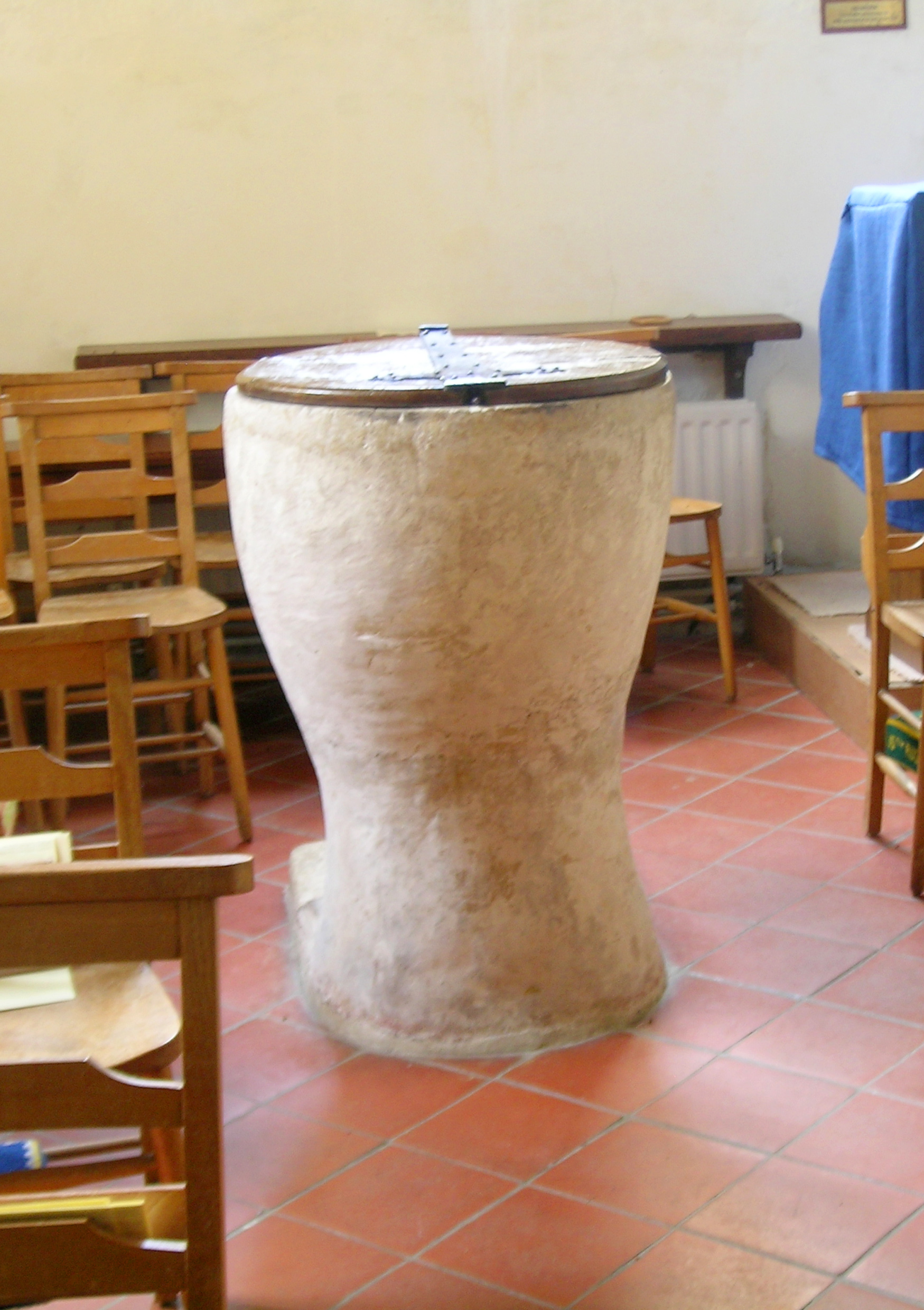
The font

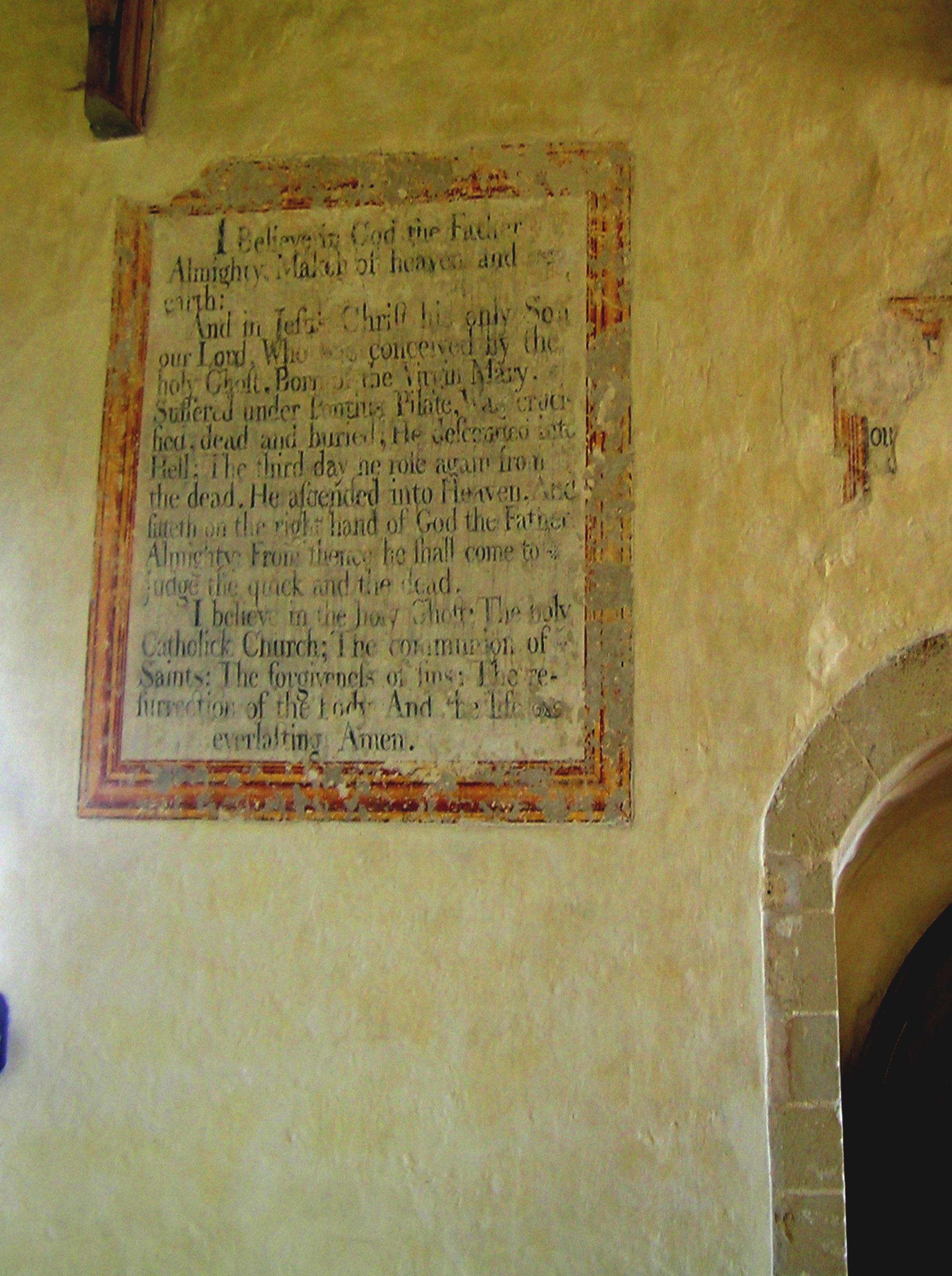
Wall painting of the Apostles' Creed on south wall of nave
