= Chiltern Way =

Long-distance footpath in southern England

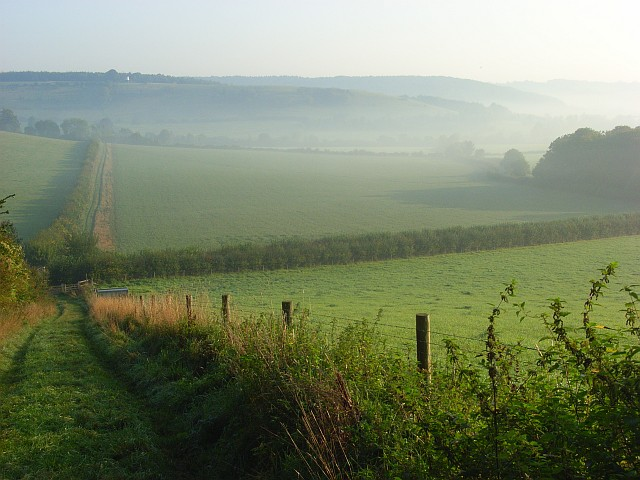
View near dawn, Turville

The Chiltern Way is a waymarked long-distance footpath in the Chiltern Hills of southern England. It was created by the Chiltern Society as a Millennium project.

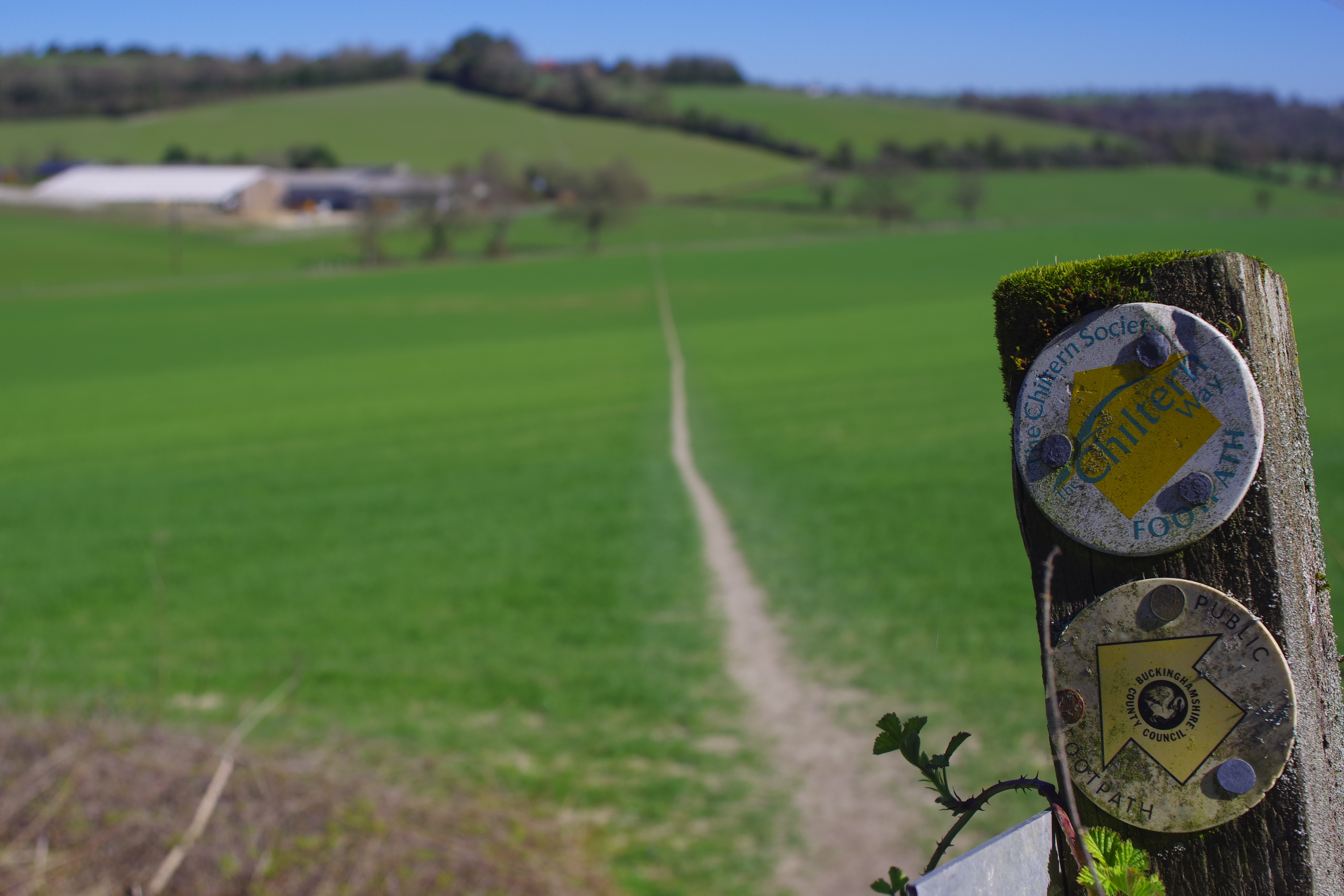
Chilterns Way near Stokenchurch, Buckinghamshire

== Route ==
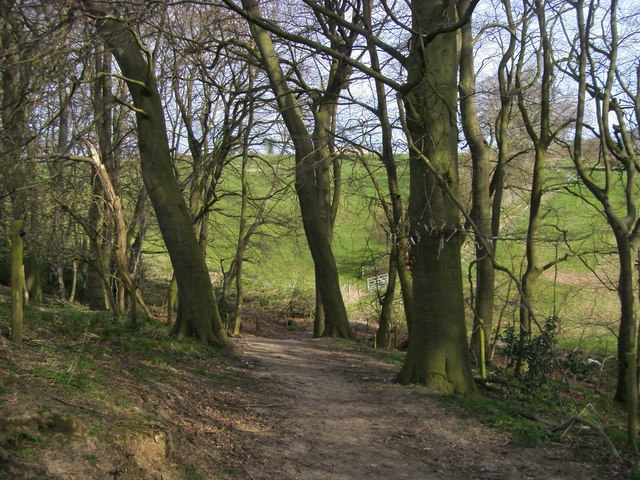
At Stokenchurch

The Chiltern Way runs for around 285 kilometres (177 mi). There is an extension - the Berkshire Loop - adding a further 47 kilometres (29 mi) between them.

The route is circular and runs through the Chiltern Hills region, passing through parts of the counties of Bedfordshire, Buckinghamshire, Hertfordshire and Oxfordshire. The route includes the Chilterns National Landscape and many of the town and villages situated in the Chilterns such as Chalfont St Giles, Goring, Radnage, Stokenchurch, Great Offley and Redbourn.

== See also ==
- Chiltern Cycleway
