= Chilterns Cycleway =

Cycling route in England

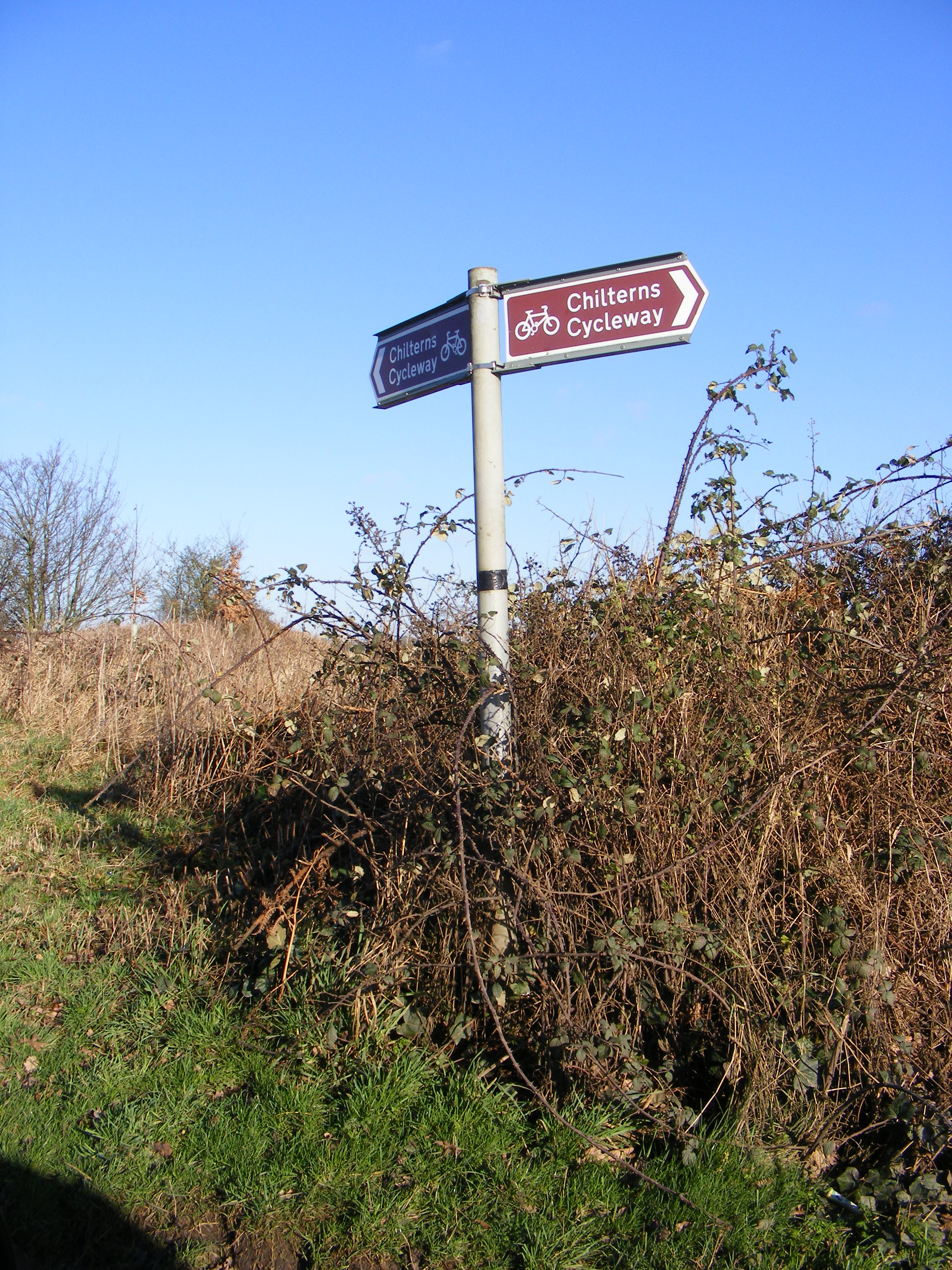
Chilterns Cycleway sign

The Chilterns Cycleway consists of a circular 170 mile (274 km) on-road route in the Chilterns Area of Outstanding Natural Beauty Chilterns AONB.

The route runs through the counties of Bedfordshire, Buckinghamshire, Hertfordshire and Oxfordshire.

== See also ==
- Chiltern Way
