= Beacon's Bottom =

Hamlet in Buckinghamshire, England

Coordinates: 51.653°N 0.865°W

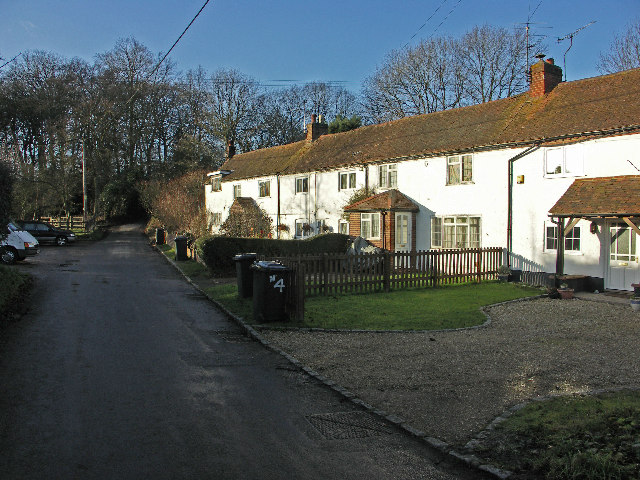
- Cottages in Beacon's Bottom, 2006

- Location within Buckinghamshire
- OS grid reference: SU786955
- Unitary authority: Buckinghamshire
- Ceremonial county: Buckinghamshire
- Region: South East
- Country: England
- Sovereign state: United Kingdom
- Post town: HIGH WYCOMBE
- Postcode district: HP14
- Police: Thames Valley
- Fire: Buckinghamshire
- Ambulance: South Central

Beacon's Bottom, also known as Bacon's Bottom, is a hamlet on the A40 between Piddington and Stokenchurch in England. Until 1895 it was administratively part of Oxfordshire, and was transferred to Buckinghamshire with its parent parish Stokenchurch in 1896. It was one of the principal sites of High Wycombe's 19th Century chair-making industry, known locally as bodging.
