= Piddington, Buckinghamshire =

Hamlet in Buckinghamshire, England

Coordinates: 51.640°N 0.831°W

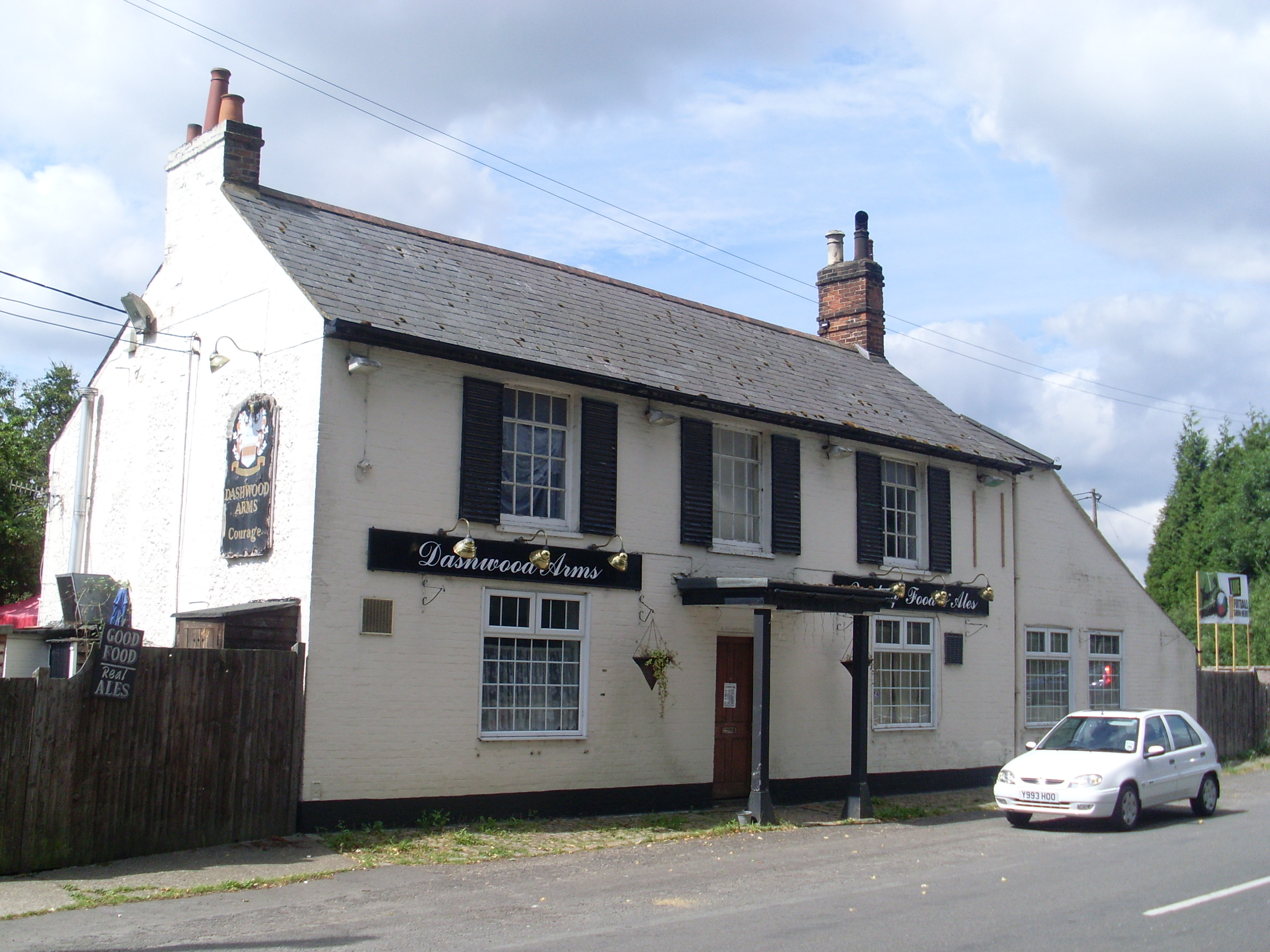
The Dashwood Arms, 2010

Piddington is a hamlet in the parish of Piddington and Wheeler End in Buckinghamshire, England. It is located on the main A40 between Stokenchurch and West Wycombe.

Piddington originally comprised a number of scattered farmsteads, a workhouse and manor house. A number of buildings, which date to the 16th and 17th centuries, still survive and the hamlet has 14 listed buildings. The Dashwood Roadhouse pub, located at the end of Old Oxford Road, was originally named the Dashwood Arms. The modern settlement of Piddington dates from 1903, when Benjamin North relocated his furniture factory from West Wycombe, with North buying land to accommodate the factory and dwellings for the factory workers. Many factory workers walked from Wheeler End. The factory is no more, but a small light industrial area now stands on its site.

There are no shops in Piddington, the nearest being in West Wycombe or Lane End. There is a village hall, however, which hosts many regular events including the annual Piddington Horticultural Society Show, and which is the local voting centre. There is a playing field located at the bottom of the hamlet, on Princes Street.
