= 1627 =

1627 in various calendars
- Gregorian calendar: 1627; MDCXXVII
- Ab urbe condita: 2380
- Armenian calendar: 1076; ԹՎ ՌՀԶ
- Assyrian calendar: 6377
- Balinese saka calendar: 1548–1549
- Bengali calendar: 1033–1034
- Berber calendar: 2577
- English Regnal year: 2 Cha. 1 – 3 Cha. 1
- Buddhist calendar: 2171
- Burmese calendar: 989
- Byzantine calendar: 7135–7136
- Chinese calendar: 丙寅年 (Fire Tiger); 4324 or 4117 — to — 丁卯年 (Fire Rabbit); 4325 or 4118
- Coptic calendar: 1343–1344
- Discordian calendar: 2793
- Ethiopian calendar: 1619–1620
- Hebrew calendar: 5387–5388
- Hindu calendars
- Vikram Samvat: 1683–1684
- Shaka Samvat: 1548–1549
- Kali Yuga: 4727–4728
- Holocene calendar: 11627
- Igbo calendar: 627–628
- Iranian calendar: 1005–1006
- Islamic calendar: 1036–1037
- Japanese calendar: Kan'ei 4 (寛永４年)
- Javanese calendar: 1548–1549
- Julian calendar: Gregorian minus 10 days
- Korean calendar: 3960
- Minguo calendar: 285 before ROC 民前285年
- Nanakshahi calendar: 159
- Thai solar calendar: 2169–2170
- Tibetan calendar: མེ་ཕོ་སྟག་ལོ་ (male Fire-Tiger); 1753 or 1372 or 600 — to — མེ་མོ་ཡོས་ལོ་ (female Fire-Hare); 1754 or 1373 or 601

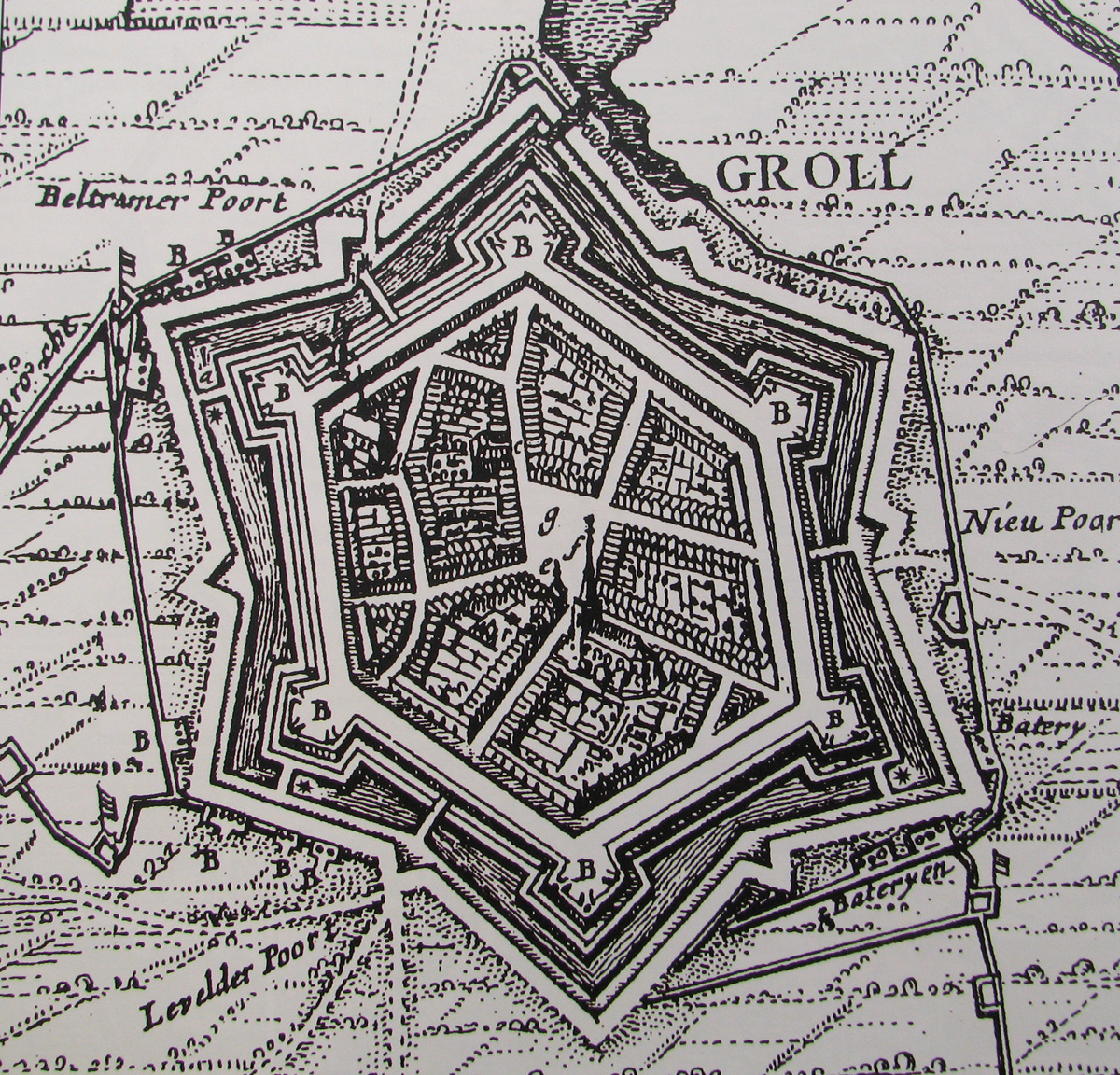
August 19: The heavily fortified Spanish Netherlands city of Grol, falling after a 30-day siege by the Dutch Republic leader, Frederick Henry, Prince of Orange.

1627 (MDCXXVII) was a common year starting on Friday of the Gregorian calendar and a common year starting on Monday of the Julian calendar, the 1627th year of the Common Era (CE) and Anno Domini (AD) designations, the 627th year of the 2nd millennium, the 27th year of the 17th century, and the 8th year of the 1620s decade. As of the start of 1627, the Gregorian calendar was 10 days ahead of the Julian calendar, which remained in localized use until 1923.

== Events ==
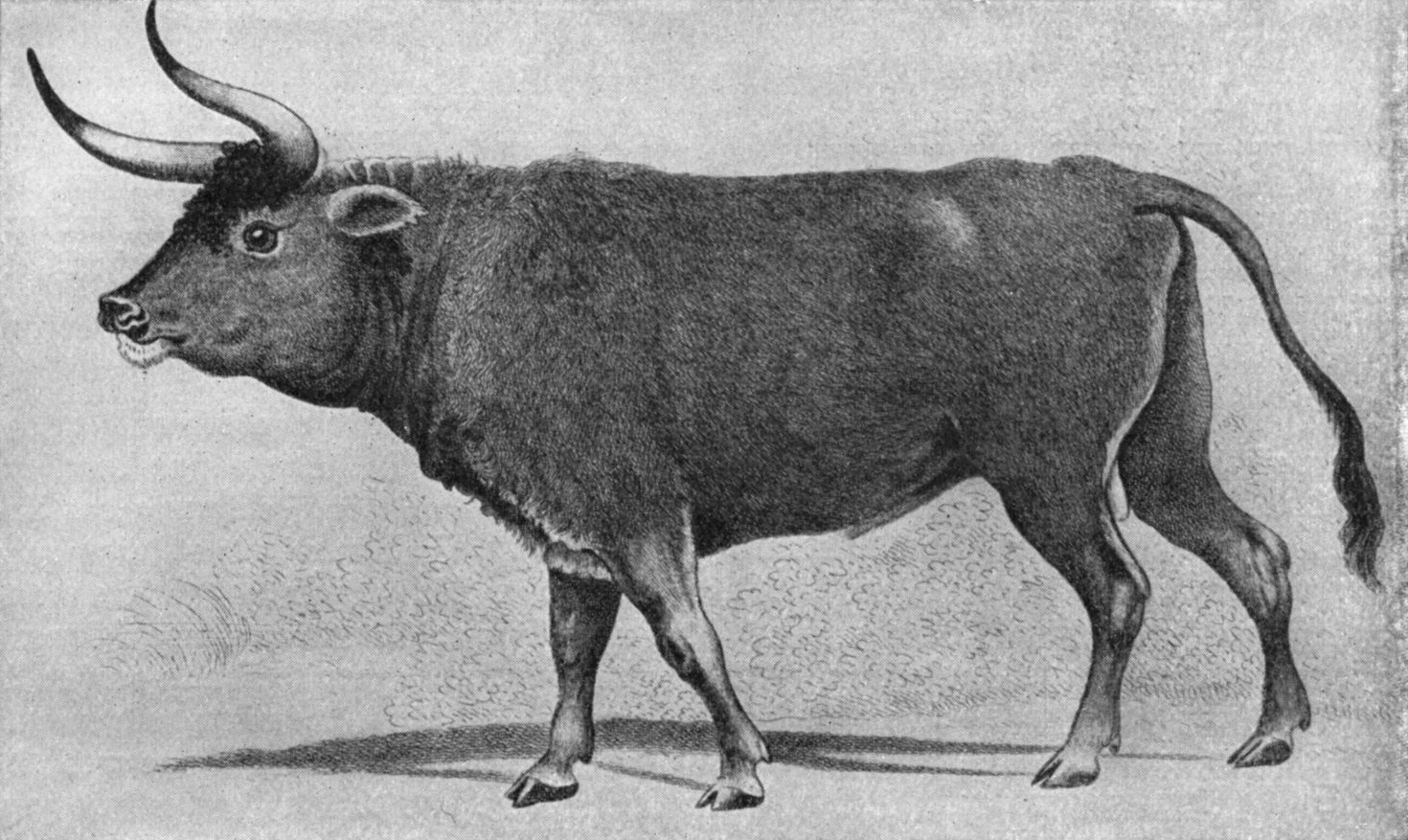
The last recorded Aurochs dies in Poland.

=== January–March ===
- January 26 – The Dutch ship 't Gulden Zeepaert, skippered by François Thijssen, makes the first recorded European sighting of the coast of South Australia.
- February 15 – The administrative rural parish of Iisalmi (Swedish: Idensalmi) is established in Savonia, by order of King Gustavus Adolphus of Sweden.
- February 17 – England lands the first European settlers on Barbados.
- March 3 – After the First Manchu invasion of Korea, the Joseon dynasty of Korea becomes a tributary state of the Manchus, but still pays respects to the Ming dynasty of China. After rejecting a Manchu alteration to the original diplomatic terms in 1636, the Manchus invade again in 1637.
- March 17 – Maurice, Landgrave of Hesse-Kassel, is forced to abdicate after his spending brings Hesse-Kassel to bankruptcy. His son takes over as William V and cedes much of the landgravate in September to bring peace in its war against Hesse-Darmstadt.
- March – Start of the Trịnh–Nguyễn War in modern-day Vietnam: Trịnh Tráng leads an army of 200,000 troops southward to attack the Đàng Trong governed by Lord Nguyễn Phúc Nguyên.

=== April–June ===
- April 10 – The 't Gulden Zeepaert reaches Batavia in the Dutch East Indies.
- April 17 – The States of Friesland agree on the 28-point Appeal about Abuses after allowing the citizens to voice their complaints.
- May 10 – The Kingdom of England reaches an agreement with Sidi Al-Ayyashi, a Moroccan Mujahidin leader to obtain his help in releasing English captives seized by Barbary corsairs.
- May 13 – France and England sign an agreement on dividing the island of Saint Kitts.
- May 23 – Ngarolamo becomes the new Sultan of Tidore in the Maluku Islands in modern-day Indonesia.
- June 15 – The States of Friesland promulgate the Resolution on the April 17 appeal about abuses.
- June 20
  - Hinchingbrooke House in the east of England is sold by Sir Oliver Cromwell, to Sidney Montagu.
  - Turkish Abductions: Barbary corsairs from Salé raid the fishing village of Grindavík in Iceland and take captives into slavery, the first of several raids.

=== July–September ===
- July 5–13 – Turkish Abductions: Barbary corsairs from Algiers raid the East Fjords of Iceland and take captives into slavery.
- July 16 – Turkish Abductions: the Barbary corsairs from Algiers raid the island of Heimaey off Iceland, take captives into slavery and kill others.
- July 20 – Eighty Years' War: Frederick Henry, Prince of Orange, begins the Siege of Grol, the last Spanish stronghold in the eastern Netherlands, and captures it after 30 days.
- July 22 – The English, under the Duke of Buckingham, invade the Île de Ré off the coast of France in support of the Huguenots in La Rochelle; the invasion fails.
- July 27 – An earthquake destroys the cities of San Severo and Torremaggiore in southern Italy.
- August 16 – In a persecution of Christians in Japan, 14 Franciscan missionaries and converts are killed.
- August 19 – Eighty Years' War: Grol, in the Spanish Netherlands, is captured after the siege started on July 20 by Prince Frederick Henry.
- September 10 – The Siege of La Rochelle begins as the Roman Catholic nations of France and Spain move to suppress the revolt of Protestant Huguenots in the western French city.
- September 12 – Mohammed Adil Shah begins his reign as the new Sultan of Bijapur in south India, after the death of his father, Ibrahim Adil Shah II.
- September 24 – William V, Landgrave of Hesse-Kassel, landgrave of the German state Hesse-Kassel, signs the Hauptakkord with George II of Hesse-Darmstadt, ceding much of its territory.
- September 30 – The reign of China's 21-year old ruler, the Ming dynasty Tianqi Emperor, Zhu Youjiao, ends after seven years.

=== October–December ===
- October 2 – The Tianqi Emperor's 16-year-old brother, Zhu Youjian, is enthroned as the Chongzhen Emperor.
- October 28 – The Mughal Emperor Jahangir dies of a respiratory illness near Bhimber while attempting to return to his palace at Lahore.
- November 7 – Shahryar Mirza, the 22-year-old son of Jahangir and son-in-law of Jahangir's widow Nur Jahan, is installed as the new Mughal Emperor at Lahore.
- November 20 – Thirty Years' War: Bogislaw XIV, Duke of Pomerania, signs the Capitulation of Franzburg, in which Pomerania is forced to pay for the Imperial army that Wallenstein sent to occupy it. Nonetheless, despite the treaty, Pomerania is devastated by the Imperial troops.
- November 28 – Polish-Swedish War: Battle of Oliwa – A Polish-Lithuanian fleet defeats a Swedish fleet.
- December 18 – La selva sin amor (The Forest without Love), written by Lope de Vega and with music by Alessandro Piccinini, premieres as the first Spanish opera.
- December 25 – Vincenzo II Gonzaga, Duke of Mantua, dies of poor health at the age of 33. Charles I Gonzaga becomes the Duke over the objections of Charles Emmanuel I of Savoy, leading to the War of the Mantuan Succession.
- December 27 – In Madrid, ministers of King Philip IV of Spain, draw up proposals for a "Kingdom and Republic of Ireland" that would break with England, to have two Captains General to be executives of the Republic.
- December 30 (Jumada-l awwal 2, 1037 AH) – Shihab-ud-Din Muhammad Khurram, son of the later Emperor Jahangir, enters Lahore after defeating his brother Shahryar Mirza. He is proclaimed as Shah Jahan.

=== Date unknown ===
- Habsburg Spain suffers an economic collapse.
- The last recorded aurochs die in the Jaktorów Forest of Poland.
- Rock blasting is invented: Black gunpowder is first used in mining, in a mineshaft under Banská Štiavnica, Slovakia.

== Births ==
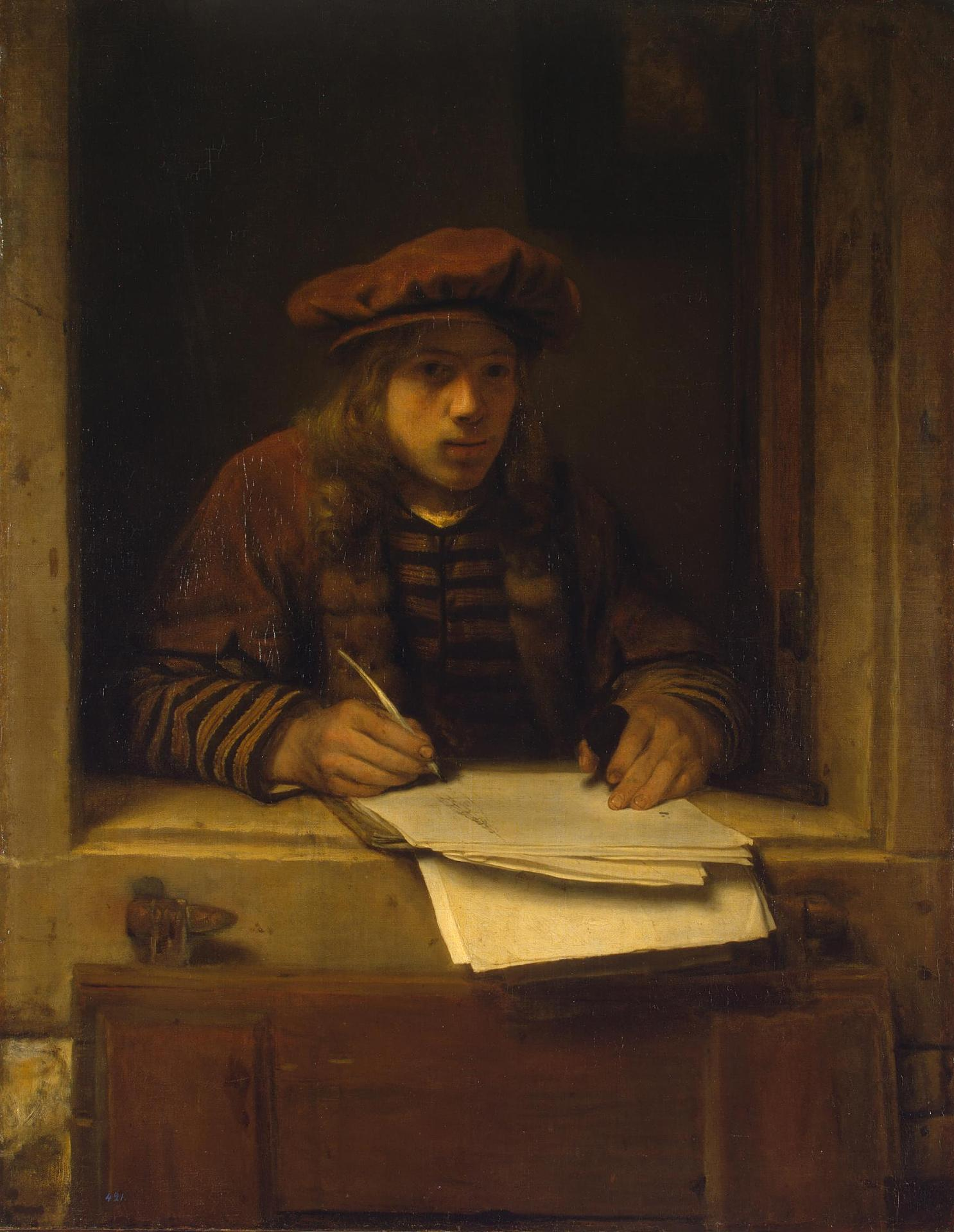
Samuel Dirksz van Hoogstraten

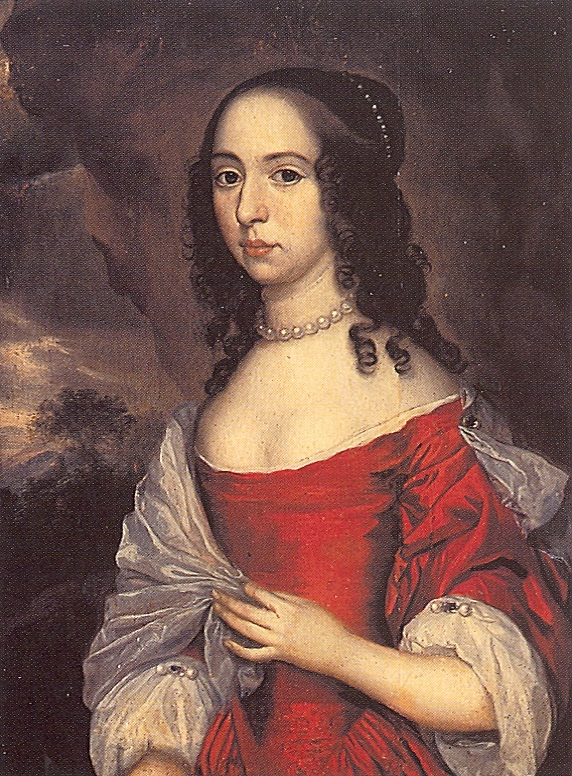
Countess Louise Henriette of Nassau

=== January–March ===
- January 25 – Robert Boyle, Anglo-Irish scientist (d. 1691)
- February 2 – Sir Robert Kemp, 2nd Baronet, English politician (d. 1710)
- February 10 – Cornelis de Bie, Flemish poet, jurist (d. 1715)
- February 15 – Charles Morton, Cornish nonconformist minister (d. 1698)
- February 21 – Philips Augustijn Immenraet, Flemish painter (d. 1679)
- February 28 – Aubrey de Vere, 20th Earl of Oxford (d. 1703)
- March 9
  - Thomas Howard, 5th Duke of Norfolk, English noble (d. 1677)
  - Walter Moyle, English politician (d. 1701)
- March 14 – Roelant Roghman, Dutch Golden Age painter (d. 1692)
- March 27 – Sir Stephen Fox, English politician (d. 1716)

=== April–June ===
- April 9 – Johann Caspar Kerll, German baroque composer and organist (d. 1693)
- April 22 – Tsarevna Irina Mikhailovna of Russia (d. 1679)
- May 4 – Giuseppe Francesco Borri, Italian alchemist (d. 1695)
- May 16
  - Willem van Aelst, Dutch artist (d. 1683)
  - Rudolph Augustus, Duke of Braunschweig-Wolfenbüttel (d. 1704)
- May 17 – Hector d'Andigné de Grandfontaine, Governor of Acadia from 1670 to 1673 (d. 1696)
- May 29
  - Anne, Duchess of Montpensier, French princess and duchess (d. 1693)
  - Nikolaj Nissen, Danish judge (d. 1684)
- June 4 – Eiler Holck, Danish military officer (d. 1696)
- June 14 – Johann Abraham Ihle, German amateur astronomer (d. 1699)
- June 19 – Thomas Richardson, 2nd Lord Cramond, English Member of Parliament (d. 1674)

=== July–September ===
- July 1 – Anna Maria of Mecklenburg-Schwerin, consort of Augustus, Duke of Saxe-Weissenfels (d. 1669)
- July 3 – Juan Ortega y Montañés, Spanish Catholic bishop, colonial administrator in Guatemala and New Spain (d. 1708)
- July 18 – Henry Howard, 5th Earl of Suffolk, youngest son of Theophilus Howard (d. 1709)
- July 20 – Thomas Wynne, English personal physician of William Penn (d. 1691)
- July 28 – John Francis Desideratus, Prince of Nassau-Siegen (1652–1699) (d. 1699)
- August 1 – Princess Louise of Savoy, Hereditary Princess of Baden-Baden (d. 1689)
- August 2 – Samuel Dirksz van Hoogstraten, Dutch painter of the Golden Age (d. 1678)
- August 8
  - Bartolomé Garcia de Escañuela, Spanish Catholic prelate, Bishop of Durango (1676–1684), Bishop of Puerto Rico (1670–1676) (d. 1684)
  - Joseph Moxon, English printer (d. 1691)
- August 21
  - Louis Cousin, French translator (d. 1707)
  - August of Legnica, Silesian nobleman (d. 1679)
- August 26 – Philipp Jakob Sachs, German physician (d. 1672)
- August 30
  - Margaretha van Godewijk, Dutch Golden Age poet and painter (d. 1677)
  - Itō Jinsai, Japanese philosopher (d. 1705)
- September 11 – John Ernest II, Duke of Saxe-Weimar (1662–1683) (d. 1683)
- September 12 – Humbertus Guilielmus de Precipiano, Belgian Catholic archbishop (d. 1711)
- September 27 – Jacques-Bénigne Bossuet, French bishop and theologian (d. 1704)

=== October–December ===
- October 1 – Galeazzo Marescotti, Italian Catholic cardinal (d. 1726)
- October 3 – William Crispin, one of five English Commissioners appointed by William Penn for settling Pennsylvania (d. 1681)
- October 4
  - Sir John Fagg, 1st Baronet, English politician (d. 1701)
  - Francisco Varo, Spanish linguist (d. 1687)
- November 5 – Herman Egon, Prince of Fürstenberg, High Chamberlain of the Elector of Bavaria (d. 1674)
- November 12 – Diego Luis de San Vitores, Spanish Jesuit missionary to Guam (d. 1672)
- November 14 – Marie Jonas de la Motte, Dutch prostitute (d. 1683)
- November 16 – Erasmus Finx, German polymath (d. 1694)
- November 17 – John George II, Prince of Anhalt-Dessau (1660–1693) (d. 1693)
- November 20 – Charlotte, Landgravine of Hesse-Kassel, German noble (d. 1686)
- November 24 – Theophil Großgebauer, German theologian (d. 1661)
- November 29 – John Ray, English biologist (d. 1705)
- December 3 – St John Brodrick, Irish Member of Parliament (d. 1711)
- December 7 – Countess Louise Henriette of Nassau, Electress Consort of Brandenburg (1646–1667) (d. 1667)
- December 10 – Jean Baptiste de Champaigne, Flemish painter (d. 1681)
- December 24 – Daniel Pawłowski, Polish writer (d. 1673)
- December 28 – Alessandro Rosi, Italian artist (d. 1697)

=== Date unknown ===
- Maria Sofia De la Gardie, Swedish countess and industrialist (d. 1694)
- Sir John Flavel, English dissenter and writer (d. 1691)
- Philip Fruytiers, Flemish painter (d. 1666)
- Turhan Hatice, regent of the Ottoman Empire (d. 1683)

=== Approximate date ===
- Ariana Nozeman, Dutch actress (d. 1661)

== Deaths ==
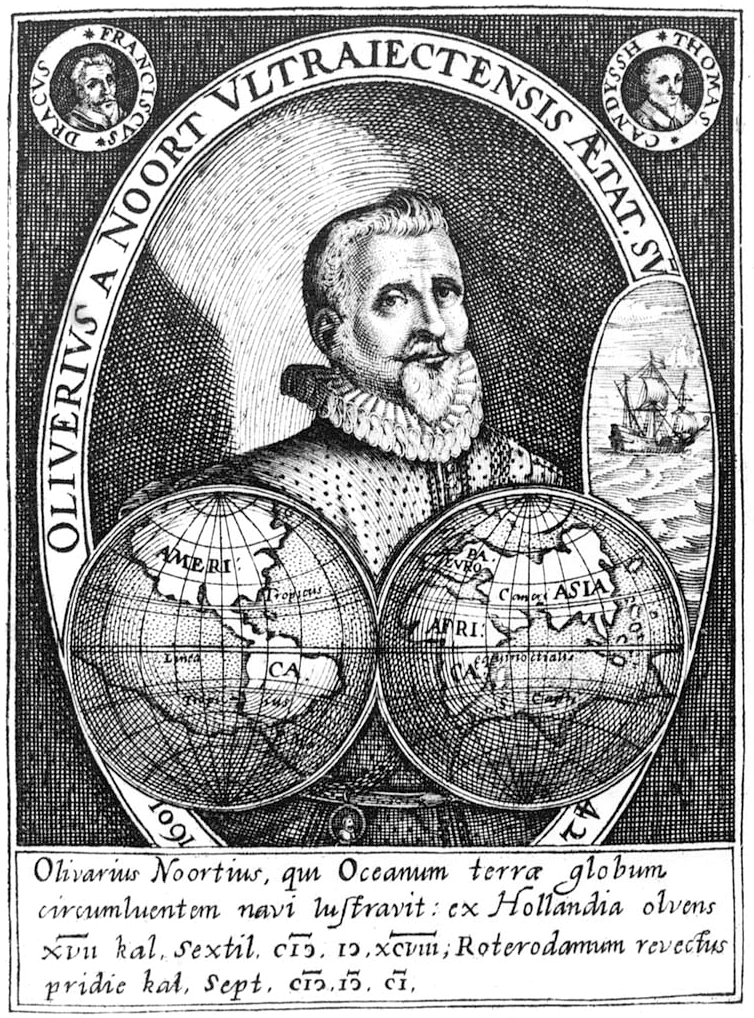
Olivier van Noort

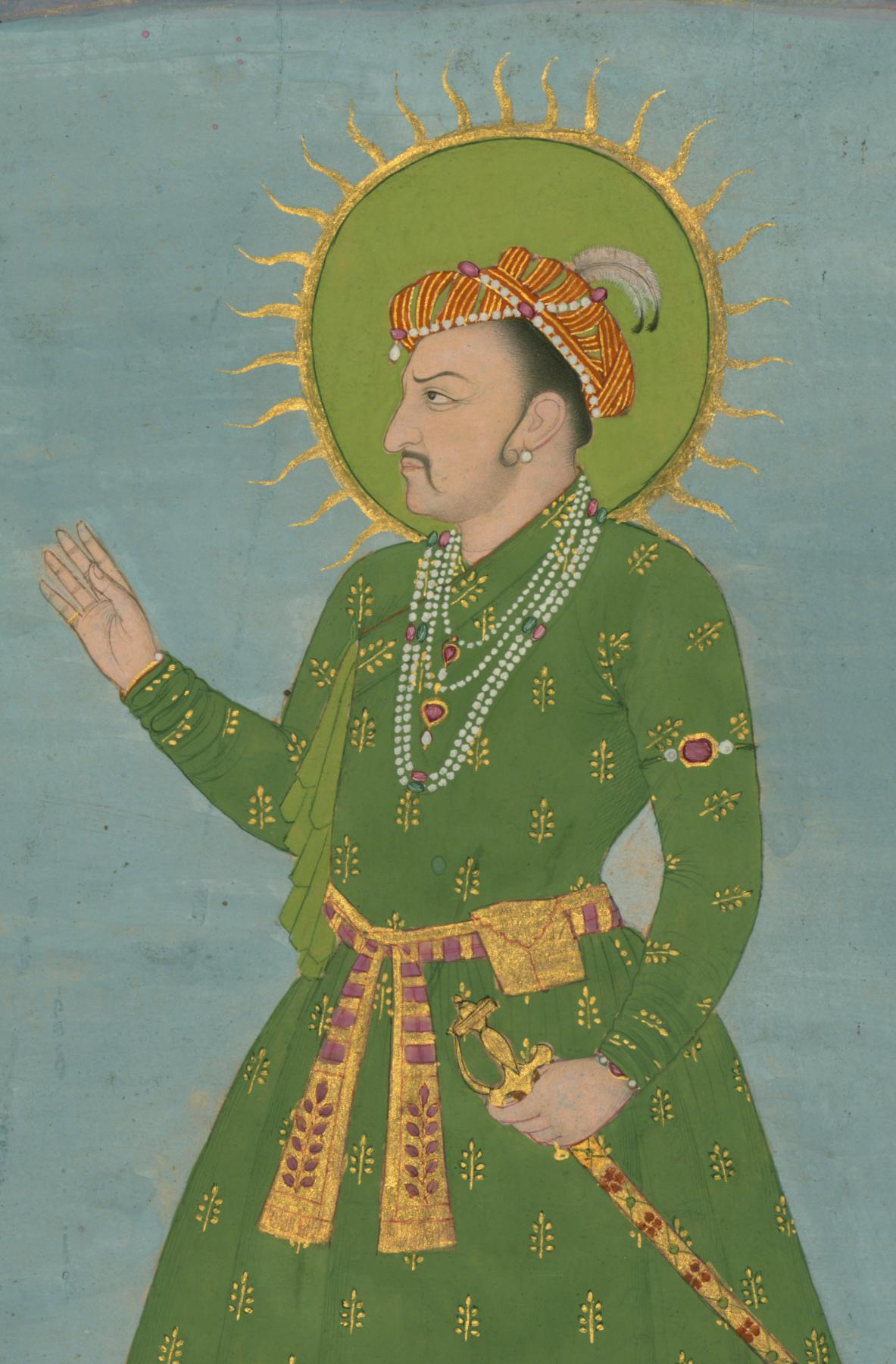
Jahangir

- January 14 – John Casimir, Count of Erbach-Breuberg (1606–1627) (b. 1584)
- January 27 – Princess Cecilia of Sweden (b. 1540)
- February 18 – Edmund Bowyer, English politician (b. 1552)
- February 12 – Karl I, Prince of Liechtenstein (b. 1569)
- February 22 – Olivier van Noort, Dutch navigator (b. 1558)
- March 26 – Simon VII, Count of Lippe-Detmold (1613–1627) (b. 1587)
- March 6 – Krzysztof Zbaraski, Polish statesman (b. 1580)
- March 10 – Elizabeth de Vere, Countess of Derby, British businessman (b. 1575)
- March 20 – Johann Jacob Grasser, Swiss poet, historian and theologian (b. 1579)
- March 23 – Lodovico Zacconi, Italian composer and music theorist (b. 1555)
- March 27 – Sir John Suckling, English politician (b. 1569).
- April 22 – Ahmad Baba al Massufi, Malian academic (b. 1556)
- May 2 – Lodovico Grossi da Viadana, Italian composer (b. 1560)
- May 3 – Edward Russell, 3rd Earl of Bedford, son of Sir Francis Russell (b. 1572)
- May 13 – Alexander, Duke of Schleswig-Holstein-Sonderburg (b. 1573)
- May 18 – Valerius Herberger, German theologian (b. 1562)
- May 19 – Katharina Henot, German General Postmaster, alleged witch (b. 1570)
- May 24 – Luis de Góngora, Spanish poet (b. 1561)
- June 4 – Marie de Bourbon, Duchess of Montpensier, French princess (b. 1605)
- June 27 – Sir John Hayward, English historian (b. c. 1560)
- July 4 (bur.) – Thomas Middleton, English playwright (b. 1580)
- July 17 – Pedro Álvarez de Toledo, 5th Marquis of Villafranca, Spanish noble and politician (b. 1546)
- August 21 – Jacques Mauduit, French composer (b. 1557)
- August 27 – Francesco Maria del Monte, Italian Catholic cardinal (b. 1549)
- September 20 – Jan Gruter, Dutch scholar (b. 1560)
- October 28 – Jahangir, Mughal Emperor of India (b. 1569)
- November 5 – John Ratcliffe, English politician and soldier (b. 1582)
- November 8 – Louis II, Count of Nassau-Weilburg (b. 1565)
- December – Madame Ke, influential nanny of the Tianqi Emperor of China (b. c. 1588)
- December 25 – Vincenzo II Gonzaga, Duke of Mantua, Italian duke and Catholic cardinal (b. 1594)
- date unknown
  - Hendrick Lucifer, Dutch pirate and buccaneer (b. 1583)
  - Marie Vernier, French actress (b. 1590)
