= August Hermann Francke =

German clergyman and theologian (1663–1727)

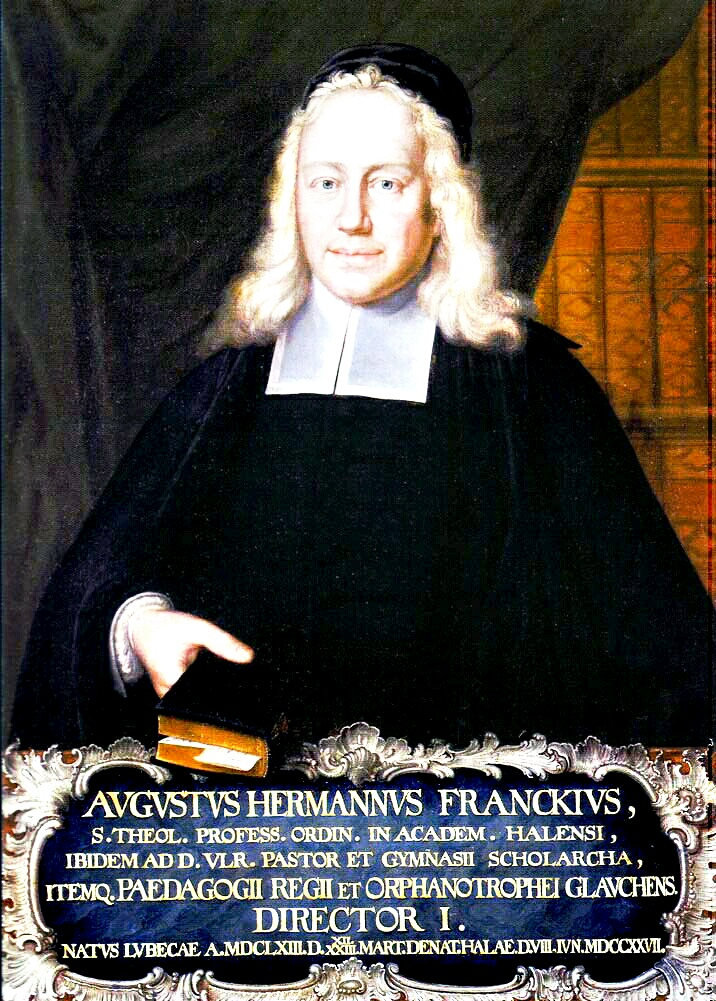
August Hermann Francke

August Hermann Francke (German: [ˈaʊɡʊst ˈhɛʁman ˈfʁaŋkə]; 22 March 1663 – 8 June 1727) was a German Lutheran pastor, theologian, philanthropist, and Biblical scholar. His evangelistic fervour and Pietism got him expelled as lecturer from the universities of Dresden and Leipzig and as deacon from Erfurt. In 1691 he found his calling at the University of Halle, where he turned towards the education of underprivileged children; he founded an orphan asylum, a Latin school, a German school (or burgher school), a Gynaeceum, the first Protestant higher girls school, and a seminary for training teachers. Francke's schools provided a prototype, which greatly influenced later German education.

== Early life and education ==
Born in Lübeck in 1663, Francke was educated at the Illustrious Gymnasium in Gotha before he studied at the universities of Erfurt and Kiel (where he came under the influence of the Pietist Christian Kortholt) and finally University of Leipzig. During his student career he made a special study of Hebrew and Greek; and in order to learn Hebrew more thoroughly, he for some time put himself under the instructions of Ezra Edzardi at Hamburg. He graduated at Leipzig, where in 1685 he became a Privatdozent.

== Career ==
A year later, with the help of his friend P. Anton, and with the approval and encouragement of Philipp Jakob Spener, he founded the Collegium Philobiblicum, at which a number of graduates met regularly for the systematic study of the Bible, philologically and practically. He next spent some months at Lüneburg as assistant or curate to the learned superintendent, Kaspar Hermann "K.C." Sandhagen, where his religious beliefs deepened. On leaving Lüneburg he spent some time in Hamburg, where he became a teacher in a private school, and made the acquaintance of Nikolaus Lange.

After a long visit to Spener, at that time a court preacher in Dresden, Francke returned to Leipzig in the spring of 1689, and began to give Bible lectures of an exegetical and practical kind, at the same time resuming the Collegium Philobiblicum of earlier days. He soon became popular as a lecturer; but the peculiarities of his teaching almost immediately aroused violent opposition on the part of the university authorities, and before the end of the year he was interdicted from lecturing on the grounds of his alleged Pietism. That was how Francke's name first came to be publicly associated with that of Spener, and with Pietism. Prohibited from lecturing in Leipzig, Francke in 1690 found work at Erfurt as "deacon" of one of the city churches. Here his evangelistic fervour attracted multitudes to his preaching, including Roman Catholics, but at the same time excited the anger of his opponents; and the result of their opposition was that after a ministry of fifteen months he was commanded by the civil authorities (27 September 1691) to leave Erfurt within forty-eight hours. That same year Spener was expelled from Dresden.

In December 1691, through Spener's influence, Francke accepted an invitation to fill the chair of Greek and oriental languages in the new University of Halle, which was at that time being organized by the elector Frederick III of Brandenburg; and at the same time, the chair having no salary attached to it, he was appointed pastor of Halle-Glaucha, in the immediate neighbourhood of Halle. He afterwards became professor of theology. Here, for the remaining thirty-six years of his life, he discharged the twofold office of pastor and professor with energy and success.

=== Schooling, 1695-1727 ===
At the very outset of his labours, he had been profoundly impressed with a sense of his responsibility towards the numerous underprivileged children who were growing up around him in ignorance and crime. After a number of tentative plans, he resolved in 1695 to institute what is often called a "ragged school", supported by public charity. A one-room school was at first sufficient, but within a year it was found necessary to purchase a house, to which another was added in 1697.

In 1698, there were 100 orphans under his charge to be clothed and fed, besides 500 children who were taught as day scholars. The schools grew in importance and were later known as the Franckesche Stiftungen. The education given was strictly religious. Hebrew was included, while the Greek and Latin classics were neglected; the Homilies of Macarius took the place of Thucydides.

A chemist, whom Francke had visited on his deathbed, bequeathed to him the recipe for compounding certain medicines, which afterwards yielded an annual income of more than $20,000, and made the institution independent. Shortly after its founding, the institution comprised an orphan asylum, a Latin school, a German school (or burgher school), and a seminary for training teachers for these establishments. Although Francke's principal aim was religious instruction, he also taught natural science and physical exercises and manual trades. He ran an apothecary's shop and, having assisted his friend Carl Hildebrand von Canstein in founding the first modern Bible society, a printing press for publishing cheap copies of the Bible for mass distribution. At the time of Francke's death, the schools were frequented by more than 2,300 pupils.

In 1698, he also founded the Gynaeceum, the first Protestant higher girls school, influenced by François Fénelon, whose work he had translated from French. Its curriculum was different from the orphanage school and the school lasted only until 1730.

In his university teaching as well, he gave great emphasis to religion. Even as professor of Greek, he had given great prominence in his lectures to the study of the Scriptures; but he found a much more congenial sphere when, in 1698, he was appointed to the chair of theology. Yet his first courses of lectures in that department were readings and expositions of the Old and New Testament; and to this, as also to hermeneutics, he always attached special importance, believing that for theology a sound exegesis was indispensable. "Theologus nascitur in scripturis", he used to say; but during his occupancy of the theological chair he lectured at various times upon other branches of theology also. Among his colleagues were Paul Anton, Joachim Lange and Johann Juncker - men who shared his beliefs.

== Personal life and death ==
Francke married Anna Magdalena von Wurm in 1694; they had three children including the theologian Gotthilf August Francke and a daughter, Johanna Sophia Anastasia who married another theologian, Johann Anastasius Freylinghausen.

Francke died in Halle on 8 June 1727.

== Legacy ==
Francke's schools provided a prototype, which greatly influenced later German education, particularly women's education. The Gynaeceum was followed by many Pietist girls schools in Germany, notably the Magdalenenstift in Altenburg and Johann Julius Hecker's Royal Elisabeth School in Berlin in 1747. In the 18th century, it became common with so called Töchterschule ('daughters' schools') in German cities, supported by the merchant class who wished for their daughters to be given elementary schooling, as well as girls' schools known as Mädchenpensionate.

Through his and his colleagues influence upon the students, Halle became a centre from which Pietism became very widely diffused over Germany. Under Francke's influence, Christian missionary efforts were greatly enhanced, zeal was aroused and recruits for Christian missions were gained, and Halle also became the centre for the Danish-Halle Mission to India.

== Works ==
Francke's principal contributions to theological literature were: Manuductio ad Lectionem Scripturae Sacrae (1693); Praelectiones Hermeneuticae (1717); Commentatio de Scopo Librorum Veteris et Novi Testamenti (1724); and Lectiones Paraeneticae (1726-1736). The Manuductio was translated into English in 1813, under the title A Guide to the Reading and Study of the Holy Scriptures.

An account of his orphanage, entitled Segensvolle Fußstapfen, (1709), which subsequently passed through several editions, has also been partially translated, under the title The Footsteps of Divine Providence, or, The Bountiful Hand of Heaven Defraying the Expenses of Faith.

- Francke, August Hermann (1704): August Hermann Franckes Schrift über eine Reform des Erziehungs- und Bildungswesens als Ausgangspunkt einer geistlichen und sozialen Neuordnung der Evangelischen Kirche des 18. Jahrhunderts: der Grosse Aufsatz. Mit einer quellenkundlichen Einführung. Hrsg. v. Otto Podczeck. Berlin. Akademie 1962.

He also wrote many hymns, including 'Thank God, towards eternity'.
