= Spener =

Spener may refer to:

- Philipp Jacob Spener (1635–1705), German Lutheran theologian
- Christian Maximilian Spener (1678–1714), German anatomist
- Jakob Karl Spener (1684–1730), German historian
- Johann Karl Philipp Spener (1749–1827), German publisher, bookseller, publicist, editor of the Haude- & Spenerschen Zeitung
- Johann Friedrich Christian Spener (1760–1825)
