= Francke Foundations =

German foundation

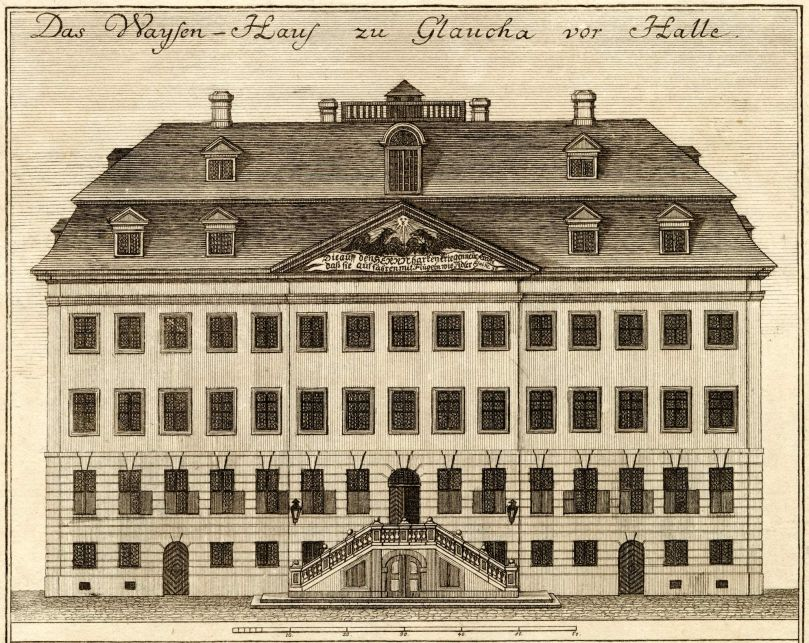
Francke Foundation: Orphanage (Engraving, 1749)

The Francke Foundations (Franckesche Stiftungen), also known as Glauchasche Anstalten were founded in 1695 in Halle, Germany as a Christian, social and educational work by August Hermann Francke

The Francke Foundations are today a non-profit educational organization housed in a complex of historic buildings. The Francke Foundations includes three kindergartens, a children’s creativity centre, four schools, a House of Generations, a youth workshop, a bible centre, traditional commercial enterprises, archives, libraries, museums, and university and non-university research facilities. More than 4,000 people learn, teach, work and live in the Francke Foundations.

The Francke Foundations have been on the German proposal list as a UNESCO World Heritage Site since 1999.

== History ==
=== 17th century ===
A pastor and professor in Halle, Francke began to take an interest, not just in giving to the poor every Thursday, the town's alms-giving day, but also in educating them in the principles of Christianity. His attempts, including paying for the children's schooling, made little impact.

In 1695, after receiving seven 50-cent pieces as a contribution to the poor, Francke thought, "Here is a goodly capital to work with; I must do a great work with this. I will found a school for the poor with it." The children were taught by students from the University. With the school gaining a strong reputation, local residents started sending their children to this school.

In the spring of 1695, Francke founded the Paedagogium, a school for higher education for members of nobility and middle class. In 1697, he added a Latin school (Latina).

In 1698, Francke started building the Orphanage for boys. Finished in 1701, it was a lavish building compared to comparable facilities. In the tympanum of the Orphanage, which is decorated with two eagles rising up to the sun, is written (Isaiah 40:31) “But those who wait for the Lord’s help, find renewed strength; they rise up as if they had eagles’ wings, they run without growing weary, they walk without getting tired.”

A visitor to the institution, Baron Canstein, wrote to a member of the Prussian government in 1706 that his visit was so pleasant and so quickening to his faith that he could not deny himself the privilege of describing the home - "a kind of little world, yet all in harmony and a state of great efficiency." The history of the school was uncommon in that it had not been fostered by government patronage but was built, and continued, through reliance on faith. "Professor Francke has been emboldened to go on with this work, beginning it without capital, and only expecting that God would provide from day to day." Francke did not ask the assistance of any man but received from day to day what was required to pay the workmen and buy all the materials. "He began with nothing; he never was beforehand with his means, yet he received so much, that though venturing to build of brick and stone, and in an expensive style of finish, he was not in arrears for this work."

Francke Foundations soon gained a reputation as the "New Jerusalem". The Foundations formed a global correspondence network that spread the reform plans of Halle Pietism internationally.

=== 18th century ===
In the 18th century, Francke Foundations started a publishing house, a book store, a printing office, a pharmacy and a Cabinet of Artefacts and Curiosities. Their revenues funded the Orphanage. In 1709 a timbered, three-storey house for orphan girls and a girls' school was established. In 1710, Francke built the English house for English and other foreign children living in Halle. In 1711 another building was built to house a dining hall and a huge and singing hall with a capacity of 2,000 persons.

In 1711, Francke and Carl Hildebrand von Canstein established the Cansteinsche Bibelanstalt (Canstein Bible Institute), the oldest bible institute in Germany. Bibles were in the early 18th century extremely expensive. An invention in letter pressing, and with financial support by von Canstein, allowed the institute to produce inexpensive Bibles in a large quantities. Until the middle of the 20th century millions of Bibles had been published.

In the following years a number of buildings were built, e.g. the long house (Langes Haus) in 1713, the largest high-timbered five- and six-storey building. It houses today a hall of residents (Evangelisches Konvikt) and a boarding school for students of the Latina. In the upper Lindenhof (linden yard), the Ökonomiegebäude was built in 1747–48 as an administration house. It is, since 1808 the base of the Stadtsingechor, the oldest boys' choir in central Germany.

=== 19th century ===
The Francke Foundations underwent decline in the late 18th century. In the early 19th century, August Hermann Niemeyer took over direction of the Foundations, renewing the educational programs and resolving financial issues.

In 1810 the Realschule was built and in 1835 girls' secondary school. The royal paedagogium (Königliches Pädagogium) was rebuilt in 1848,

=== 20th century ===
Because of its good reputation and its revenues, the Francke Foundations were growing and a new building for Lateinische Hauptschule (Latina) was built. In 1911 more than 3,000 students attended the various schools. During the time of National socialism, Francke Foundations remained a Christian formed school city. During a World War II air raid in March 1945, some Francke Foundation buildings, including the Francke residence and the Latina, were either damaged or destroyed.

In 1946, during the Soviet occupation of East Germany the presidium of the province of Saxony abolished the Francke Foundations and turned over all its assets and buildings to the Martin Luther University Halle-Wittenberg.

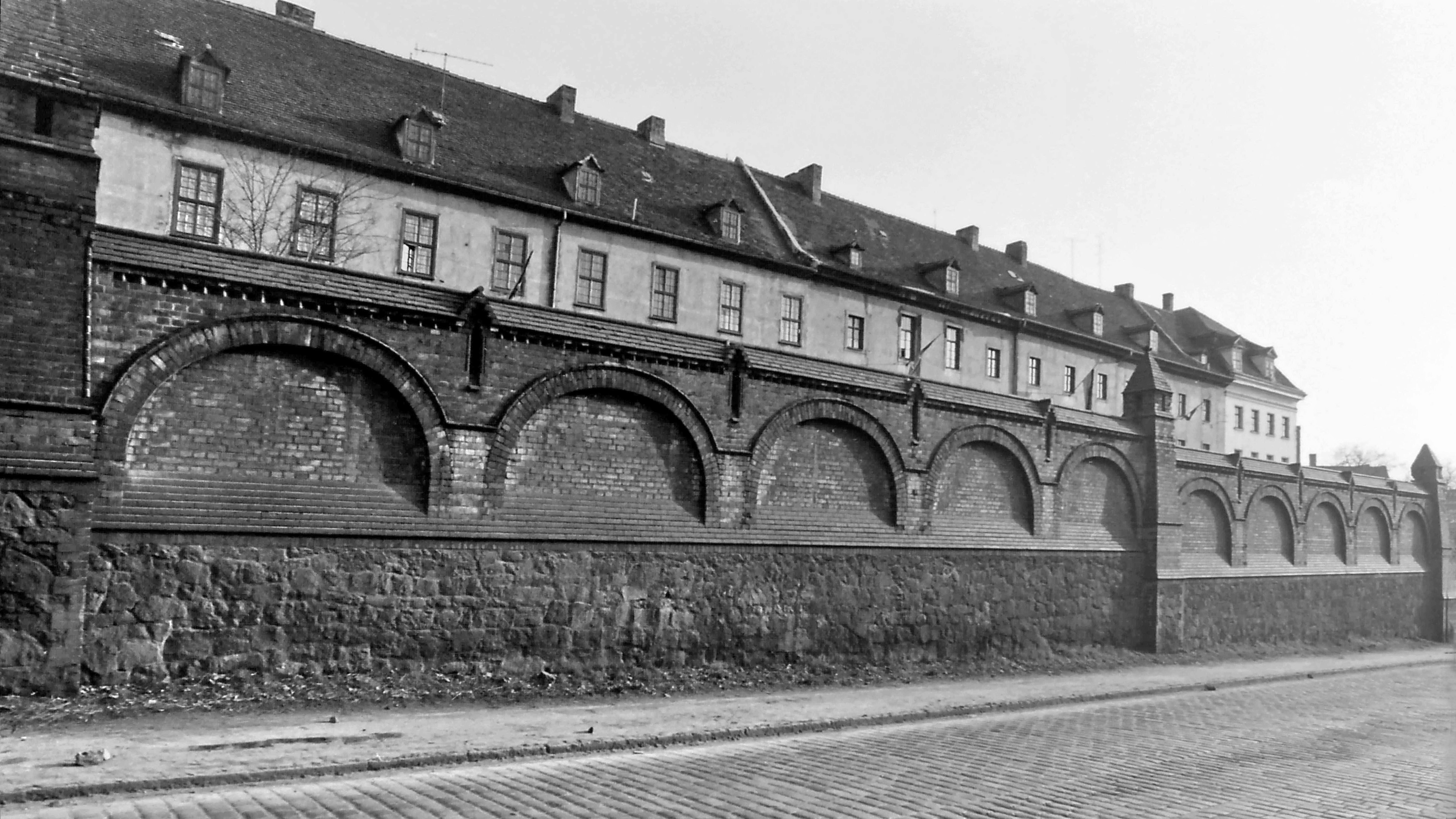
Orphanage wall in 1972 before demolition

In the 1970s, the northerly Orphanage wall had been demolished to build an elevated road (Hochstraße) to connect Halle with Halle-Neustadt. This elevated road separates the Orphanage Pharmacy from other parts of the Foundations. On the ground of the Foundations, several high rises were built.

After German Reunification in 1990, the Francke Foundations were re-established in September 1991. With assistance of the federal state of Saxony-Anhalt and private donations, the Francke Foundations building were renovated.

== Current situation and activities ==
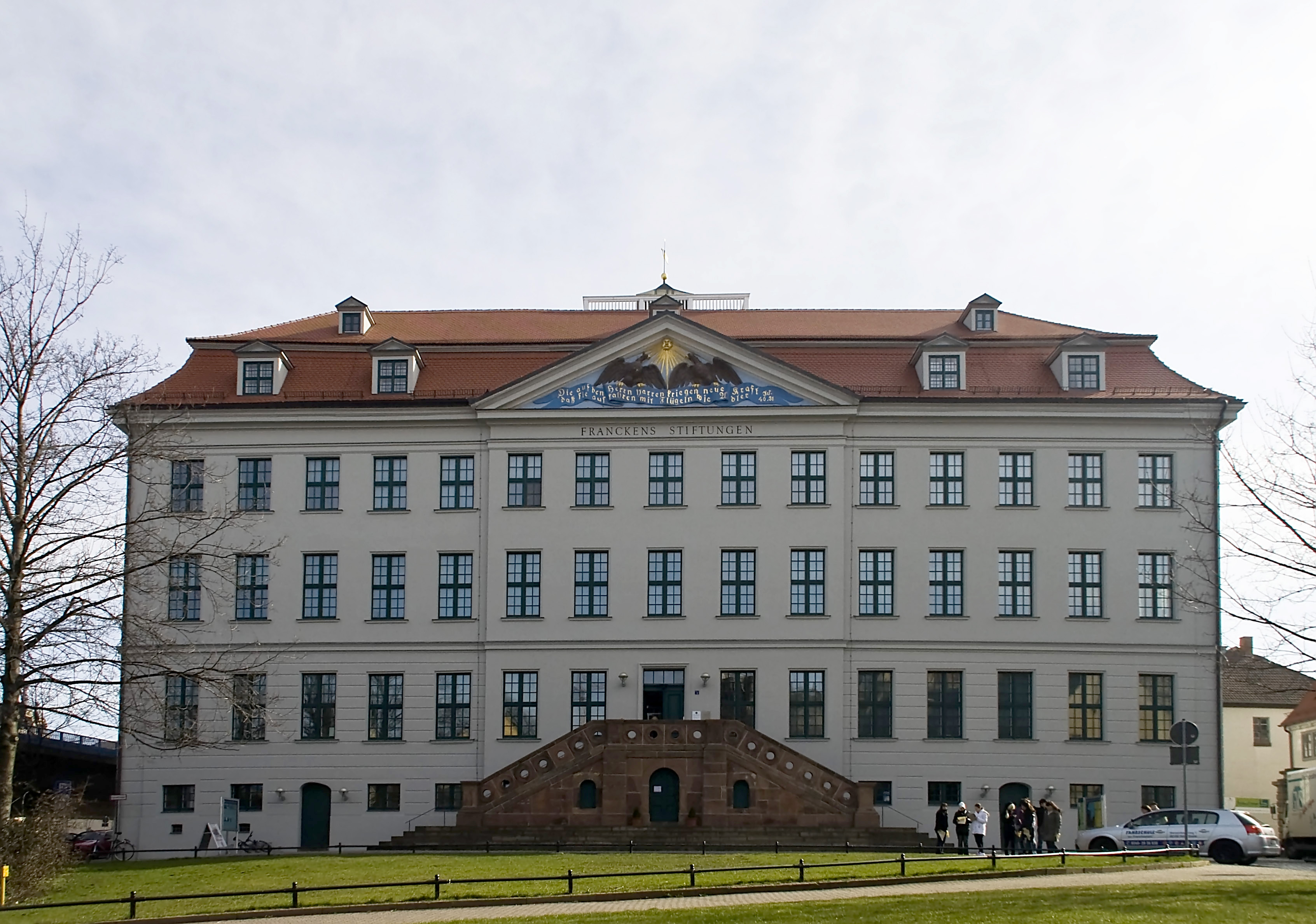
Historical orphanage (2009)

Today the Francke Foundations buildings are almost completely restored and the ensemble has been revived as cultural and scientific, social and educational institution.

On the grounds of the Francke Foundations there are now besides the institutions owned by the foundation – the Historic Orphanage, the Archives, the Historic Library and three kindergartens, children's creative education center Krokoseum – the Faculty of Theology and the Institute for Education, the Interdisciplinary Research Centres for Enlightenment Studies (Interdisziplinäres Zentrum für die Erforschung der europäischen Aufklärung) and Interdisciplinary Centre for the Studies in Pietism of the Martin Luther University (Interdisziplinäres Zentrum für Pietismusforschung), four schools (Landesgymnasium Latina "August Hermann Francke", Grundschule "August Hermann Francke", Reformschule Maria Montessori, Sekundarschule "August Hermann Francke"), a Protestant Seminary, a social workshop for young people, two church rooms (St. Georgs Kapelle, Orthodoxe Hauskirche zum Heiligen Kreuz) and the German Federal Cultural Foundation (Kulturstiftung des Bundes). .

=== Cabinet of Artefacts and Curiosities ===
The Cabinet of Artefacts and Curiosities is considered to be one of Germany’s oldest teaching and research collections. Today the original museum concept of the 18th century has been recreated in its original location in the mansard of the Historic Orphanage.

Eighteen decorated display cabinets accommodate the collection of around 3,000 naturalia artificialia, including several models. The naturalia are subdivided into stones, plants and the animal kingdom and the artefacts into the fine arts, the art of writing, coins, everyday culture and clothing.

In the Historic Orphanage several exhibitions about the history of Francke Foundation and related issues were shown. In the former prayer and singing hall, now the Freylinghausen-Saal, events, meetings and concerts take place. In the basement the children’s creative centre Krokoseum offers activities in cultural education.

=== Library and Study Center ===
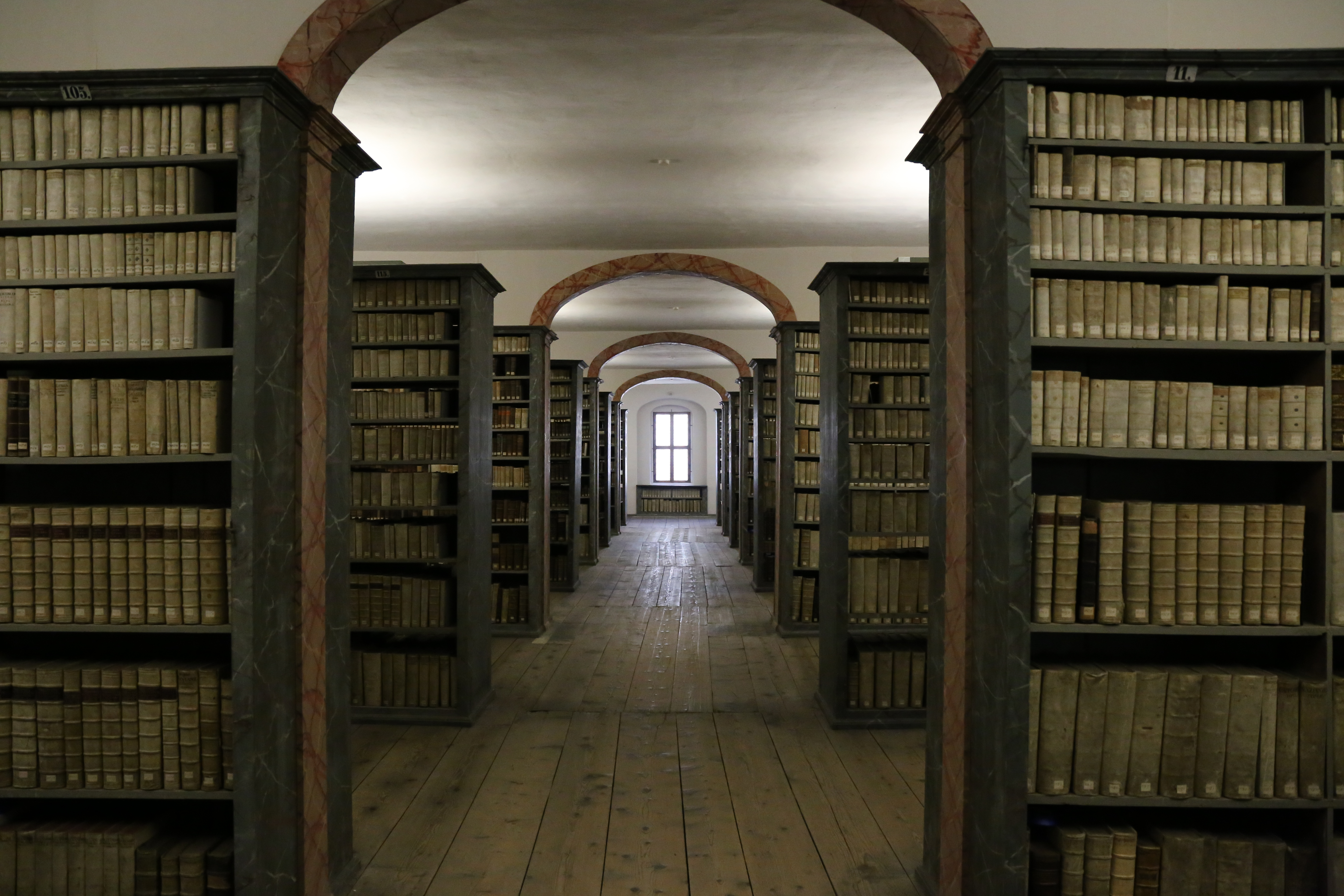
Historical Library

The Historical Library was founded at the end of the 17th century by Francke. The old library's holdings contain around 50,000 books on all areas of knowledge, but particularly on early modern church and educational history. Since 1728 the books have been housed in a purpose-built building whose original library fittings, including the stage-set like shelving, have been preserved in their entirety. From 1996 to 1998 the building was restored according to the old plans; it can now be seen again as it was in 1746.

The Study Centre is a service institution dedicated to the cataloguing of and research into the Archive and Library holdings of the Francke Foundations. In recent years, comprehensive cataloguing projects have been undertaken with financial support from the German Research Foundation. These projects deepen understanding of the sources and establish a firm basis for new research perspectives and initiatives. The Fritz Thyssen Fellowship of the Francke Foundations assists scholars in this work. Together, the Archive and the Library of the Francke Foundations form the Study Centre “August Hermann Francke”, housed in the Historical Library building (House 22) and the neighboring building (House 23/24).

=== Orthodox Chapel of the Holy Cross and the Resurrection of Jesus ===
The Chapel of the Holy Cross and the resurrection of Jesus, installed in the vaults of House 24 in the year 2000, is the only Orthodox Church in Saxony-Anhalt. The walls of the barrel vaults have been painted in accordance with the traditions of Orthodox art. They depict icons of figures from both the Old and New Testaments as well as scenes from biblical history. The iconostases of beech wood were made by a master craftsman from Halle.

=== The House of Generations ===
Originally constructed as the royal paedagogium, this building was redeveloped in 2005, as the House of Generations (Haus der Generationen).

It contains a primary Montessori school (Reformschule Maria Montessori), a nursing home (Altenheim der Paul-Riebeck-Stiftung) and a social consulting and education institution for families and health care (Familienkompetenzzentrum für Bildung und Gesundheit).
