= Bible society =

Non-profit organization devoted to translating the Bible

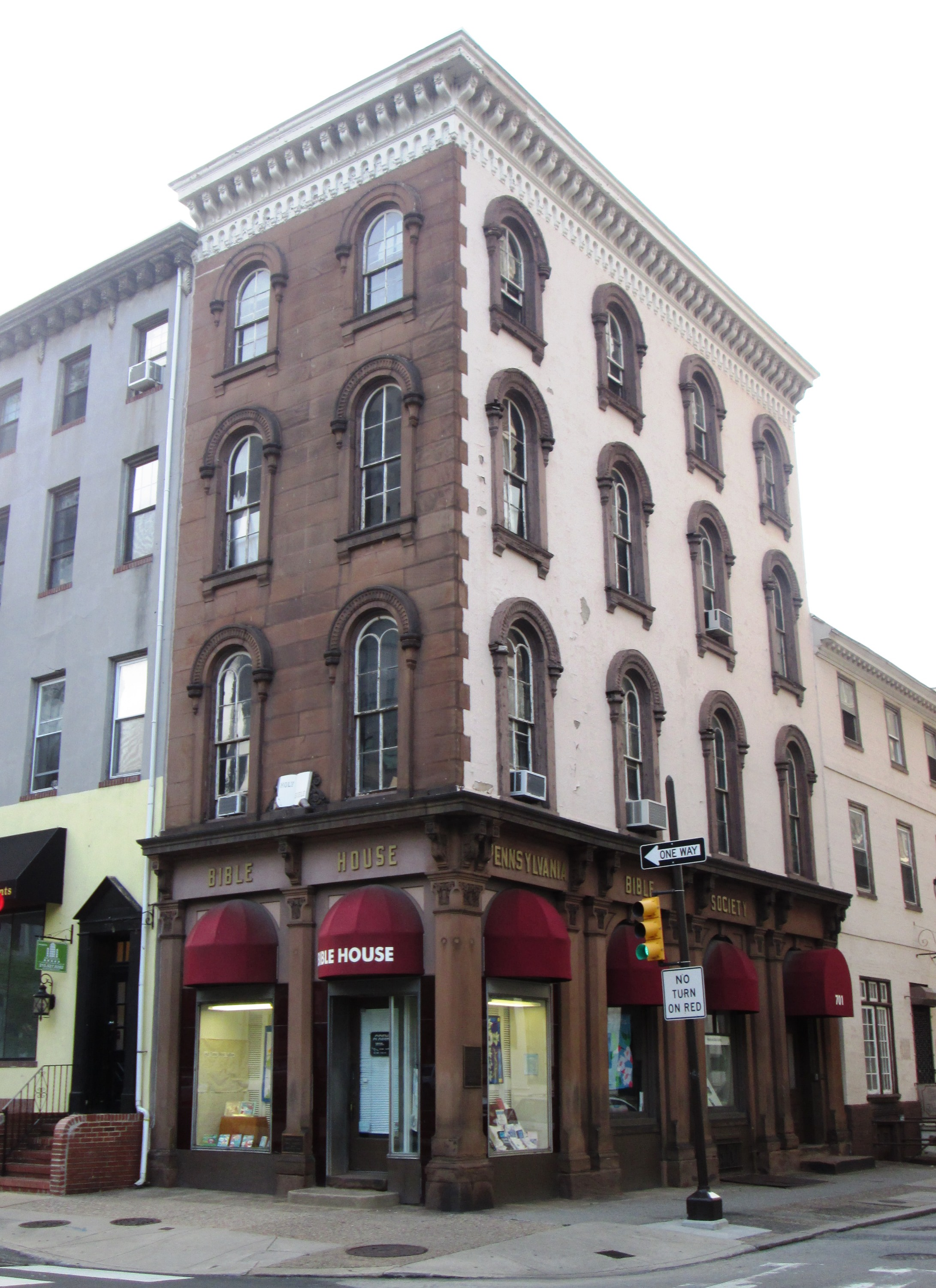
"Bible House", the headquarters of the Pennsylvania Bible Society, the oldest in the United States, founded in 1808

A Bible society is a non-profit organization, usually nondenominational in makeup, devoted to translating, publishing, and distributing the Bible at affordable prices. Traditionally Bible society editions of the Bible contain scripture without any doctrinal notes or comments, although they may include non-sectarian notes on alternate translations of words, or variations in the different available manuscripts. In recent years, societies have also been increasingly involved in advocating its credibility and trustworthiness in contemporary cultural life.

== Background ==
The production and distribution of bibles are issues that have engaged the attention of Christian leaders for centuries. In an extant letter, dated 331, Emperor Constantine requested Eusebius, bishop of Caesarea, to provide him with fifty copies of the Old and New Testaments for use in the principal churches in Constantinople. In 797, Charlemagne commissioned Alcuin to prepare an emended text of the Vulgate; multiple copies of this text were created, not always accurately, in the famous writing schools at Tours.

The first book printed in Europe was the Latin Bible, and Copinger estimates that 124 editions of the Vulgate had been issued by the end of the 15th century. The Italian Bible was printed a dozen times before 1500, and eighteen editions of the German Bible had already been published before Martin Luther's version appeared. From medieval time and then again accompanying the Protestant Reformation, there was a marked increase in interest in the scriptures. Notwithstanding the oppositional attitude adopted by the Roman Catholic Church at and after the Council of Trent (1545-1563), the translation and circulation of the Bible were undertaken with greater zeal, and in a more systematic fashion.

== History ==
The Society for the Propagation of the Gospel in New England was incorporated by an ordinance of parliament in 1649, and reincorporated in 1661, after the Restoration. The Society for Promoting Christian Knowledge (SPCK) was founded 1698. It published the King James Version of the English Bible, and translated and published editions of the Bible in other British languages such as Welsh and Manx. Early in the 18th century it printed editions in Arabic, and promoted the first versions of the Bible in Tamil and Telugu, made by the Danish Lutheran missionaries whom it then supported in south India. The earliest Scots Gaelic New Testament was published in 1767 by the Society in Scotland for Propagating Christian Knowledge (SSPCK), founded in 1709, and the Old Testament followed in 1801.

In 1710, the Canstein Bible Institute for the mass production of affordable Bibles was founded in Halle, Brandenburg-Prussia, by Karl Hildebrand, Count of Canstein.

The first organisation called "The Bible Society" was formed in 1779 to distribute Bibles to soldiers and seamen, which became the Naval and Military Bible Society in 1804. The French Bible Society, instituted in 1792, came to an end in 1803, owing to the Napoleonic Revolution. Leftover funds were given to Bible production in Welsh. The modern Bible society movement dates back to the foundation of the British and Foreign Bible Society in 1804 when a group of Christians sought to address the problem of a lack of affordable Bibles in Welsh for Welsh-speaking Christians. Although perceived as Protestant, from the early days the British and Foreign Bible Society was officially ecumenical, and allowed inclusion of the Apocrypha. As a reaction to the occasional inclusion of these books and other issues, the Trinitarian Bible Society was founded in 1831. Pope Gregory XVI, in his 1844 encyclical letter Inter praecipuas, condemned both Bible societies and "the publication, dissemination, reading, and possession of vernacular translations of Sacred Scriptures" which did not abide by the general rules and decrees of the Catholic Church, and his successor Pope Pius IX reiterated Gregory's criticism shortly after his own election to the papacy. Subsequently Catholics did not officially participate in the Society.

The British and Foreign Bible Society extended its work to England, India, Europe and beyond. Auxiliary branches were set up all over the world which later became Bible societies in their own right. Today the United Bible Societies co-ordinates the work of these separate Bible societies. Each Bible society is a non-denominational Christian network which works to translate, revise, print, and distribute affordable Bibles in their own land, according to the demands of all the churches in that land. Nowadays Bible societies print Bibles according to the canons of the countries they are in e.g. Protestant, Catholic or Orthodox, and inter-confessional versions. Bible societies work with other Christian agencies and Bible translations are done on an ecumenical basis, through the Forum of Bible Agencies International.

=== United States ===
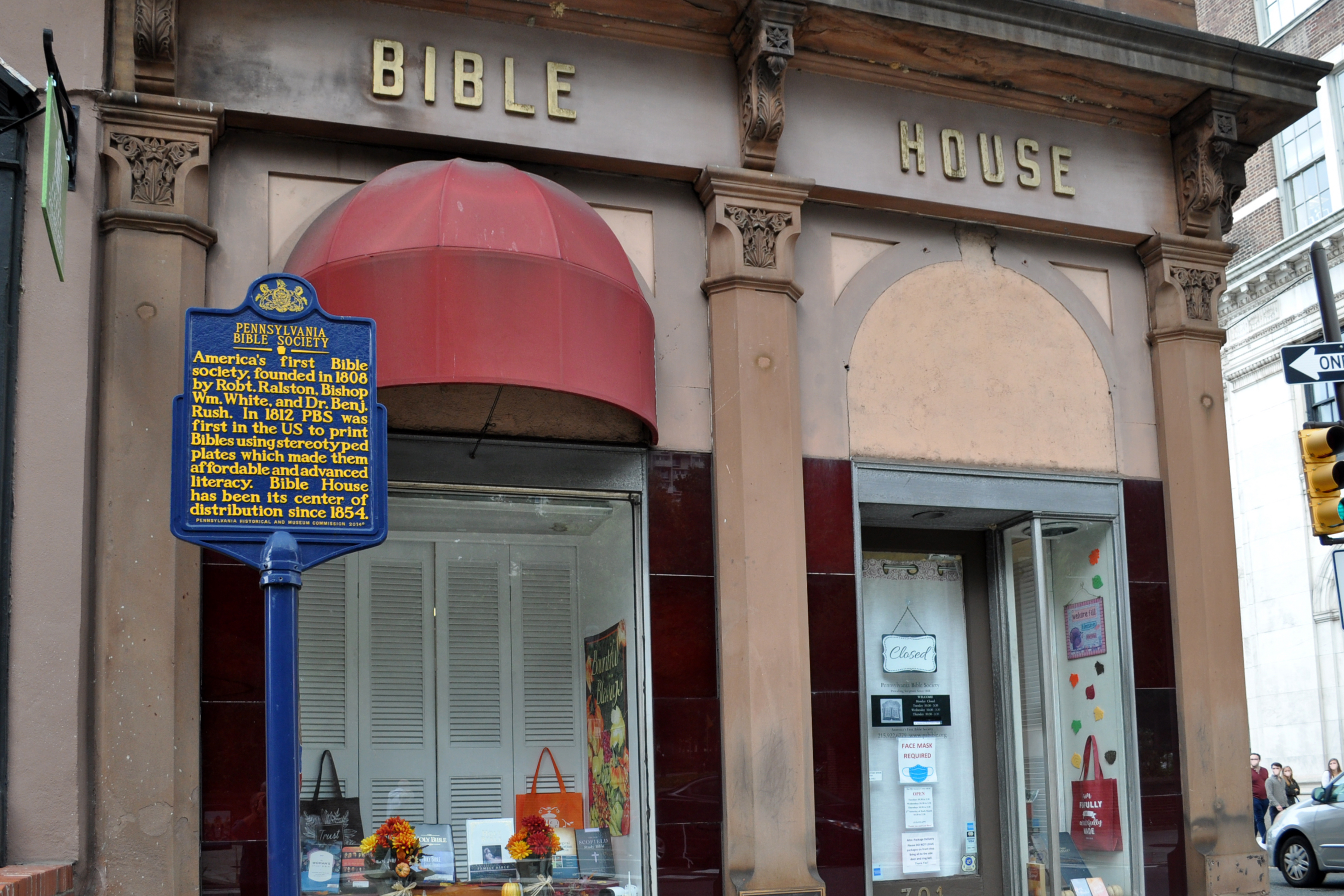
Pennsylvania Bible Society historical marker at 701 Walnut St., Philadelphia PA

In the United States, Bible societies flourished in the first half of the 19th century. In addition to the American Bible Society and the International Bible Society (now "Biblica"), a number of state and regional Bible societies were established prior to the American Civil War and to this day, they have remained active; they distribute Bibles and other works of religious literature to prisons, hospitals and shelters. Most of these regional societies are affiliated with the National Association of State and Regional Bible Societies. The oldest Bible society in the United States is the Pennsylvania Bible Society, which was founded in 1808. The Bible society movement spread west as far as Chicago, where the Chicago Bible Society was founded in 1840, making it only five years younger than the city itself.

== Current societies ==
=== United Bible Societies ===
The United Bible Societies (UBS) is a worldwide association of Bible societies. As of September 2019 the UBS has 148 member or associated Bible societies, working in more than 200 countries and territories. They include:

- British and Foreign Bible Society (1804)
- National Bible Society of Ireland (1806)
- Bible Society of Northern Ireland (1807)
- Scottish Bible Society (1809)
- Bible Society of India (1811)
- Finnish Bible Society (1812)
- Russian Bible Society (1813/1990)
- Netherlands Bible Society (1814)
- Icelandic Bible Society (1815)
- Swedish Bible Society (1815)
- American Bible Society (1816)
- Norwegian Bible Society (1816)
- Bible Society In Australia (1817)
- Hellenic Bible Society (1819)
- Bible Society of South Africa (1820)
- Colombian Bible Society (1825)
- Singapore Auxiliary Bible Society
- Bible Society New Zealand (1846)
- Bible Society of Egypt (1883)
- Philippine Bible Society (1899)
- Alliance Biblique Française (1901)
- Canadian Bible Society (1906)
- Japanese Bible Society (1937)
- Korean Bible Society (1949)
- Deutsche Bibelgesellschaft (German Bible Society) (1948)
- Sociedade Bíblica do Brasil (Brazilian Bible Society) (1948)
- Hungarian Bible Society (1949)
- Lembaga Alkitab Indonesia (Indonesian Bible Society) (1954)
- Bible Society of Nigeria (1966)
- Bible Society of Malaysia (1986)
- Slovak Bible Society (1990)
- Ukrainian Bible Society (1991)
- Slovenian Bible Society (1993)

=== Non-UBS Bible societies ===
- Naval and Military Bible Society (1779)
- International Bible Society now called Biblica (1809)
- Trinitarian Bible Society (1831)
- Pennsylvania Bible Society (1808)
- Watch Tower Bible and Tract Society of Pennsylvania (1884)
- Valera Bible Society (2001)
- King James Bible Society

=== Other translation groups ===
- Pioneer Bible Translators (1976)
- Institute for Bible Translation
- Wycliffe Bible Translators (1942)
- Kartidaya (1989)

=== Non-translation groups ===
- The Catholic Biblical Federation (1968)
- Gideons International (1899) (Note: Gideons do not translate but distribute existing translations of the Bible.)
- Amity Foundation (Note: The Amity Printing Company, partly helped by the United Bible Societies, does not translate, but is the largest printing shop of the Bible in China.)

== See also ==
- Bible advocacy
- Bible translation
- Bible in the Schools (1922)
- Massachusetts Bible Society (1809)
