= Dare Ajiboye =

Nigerian cleric (born 1965/66)

Dare Ajiboye is an author, and was a former chief executive officer, and a former general secretary of the Bible Society of Nigeria. Dr. Dare Ajiboye is a past General Secretary/Chief Executive Officer of The BS Nigeria, having retired from the Society on June 30, 2021, due to his clocking of the mandatory retirement age of 55.

Speaking at the sendoff party organized in his honour in Lagos, Nigeria, on Wednesday, June 30, 2021, former President Olusegun Obasanjo, who was the father of the day at the event, described Ajiboye as the epitome of excellence and very passionate about the Bible cause. The Director-General, United Bible Societies, the global fellowship of Bible Societies, Mike Perreau, showered encomium on Dr Ajiboye for giving 26 years of his adult life to the Bible cause. He added that he did not only make an impact in BS Nigeria but also gave enviable leadership to the Societies in Sub-Saharan Africa.

== Publications ==
- Succession planning basics in faith-based and secular organisations
