= Dresden University =

Dresden University may refer to:

- TU Dresden (Technische Universität Dresden), Dresden, Germany, one of the 10 largest universities in Germany, founded 1828
- Dresden International University, partner to Dresden University of Technology which serves Chinese and other international students, in Dresden, since 2003
- Dresden University of Applied Sciences (Hochschule für Technik und Wirtschaft Dresden), founded 1992, second largest post-secondary school in Dresden

== See also ==
- School of International Studies of the Dresden University of Technology
- Dresden Academy of Fine Arts
