= Inter praecipuas machinationes =

1844 papal encyclical by Gregory XVI

Inter praecipuas Latin for 'Among the major' Encyclical of Pope Gregory XVI
- Signature date: 8 May 1844
- Subject: Church and state
- Number: 9 of 9 of the pontificate
- Text: In English

Inter praecipuas machinationes, or On Biblical Societies, was the final encyclical letter issued by Pope Gregory XVI. It was issued on 8 May 1844 and condemned Protestant translations of the Bible.

== Contents ==
Following the earlier writings of Popes Pius VII, Leo XII, and Pius VIII, Gregory condemns Bible societies for their distribution of unapproved Bible editions. He accuses the Christian League, in New York, of "inciting sedition", converting Catholic Italian immigrants to Protestantism by encouraging them to form their own interpretations of the Bible.

== Reactions ==
Many American Protestants saw Gregory's position as conceding that Catholic doctrines were unbiblical. Protestant groups like the Plymouth Brethren took the encyclical as evidence that Catholic countries were in need of their missionary labor.
