= Bible Society of Nigeria =

Nigerian Christian non-governmental organisation

Bible Society of Nigeria (Bible Society)
- Abbreviation: BSN
- Formation: 1966
- Type: Non-governmental organization
- Purpose: Bible distribution, translation, advocacy, literacy, engagement, production
- Headquarters: Apapa, Lagos
- Region served: Nigeria
- President: Bishop Dr. Olubunmi Timothy Banwo
- General Secretary and Chief Executive Officer: Pastor Samuel Adesola Sanusi
- Website: www.biblesociety-nigeria.org

The Bible Society of Nigeria (abbreviated BSN) is a Christian non-governmental and not for profit organization in Nigeria that translates, publishes and distributes Bibles in English and several local Nigerian languages . It was established on 8 February 1966, building on earlier work by the British and Foreign Bible Society, the American Bible Society, and the Scottish Bible Society, which translated and published the Bible in the Efik language in 1868. Pastor Samuel Adesola Sanusi is the current General Secretary and Chief Executive Officer of the Bible Society of Nigeria.

== History ==
The Bible Society of Nigeria was founded on 8 February 1966 through the pioneering efforts of the late Dr. Francis Ezeogo Akanu Ibiam, the first indigenous Governor of the defunct Eastern Region. Earlier in February, 1965, Dr. Ibiam had initiated a consultation with representatives of most of the Churches [Church organizations] in Nigeria on the need to form a national Bible Society in Nigeria. It was the unanimous decision of that meeting that The Bible Society of Nigeria be formed which consequently led to its formation and inauguration on 8 February 1966. Before 1966, The Society was under the supervision of the British and Foreign Bible Society [BFBS] which had operated in Nigeria as far back as 1807. Then the Bible House, Apapa was serving as a distribution centre to other neighbouring West African countries.

== The Society Today ==
The society has it headquarters at Office Address 18, Wharf Road, Apapa, Lagos State, Nigeria. Its corporate office is located at 150, Ikorodu Road, Onipanu, Lagos State, Nigeria. It has Bible Distribution centres in other Nigerian cities:

- ABUJA: 23, Ndola Crescent, Wuse Zone 5, Abuja.
- LAGOS II: 7, Boladale Street, Opposite Mr. Biggs Oshodi.
- ABA: The Bible Society of Nigeria, St. Michael’s Cathedral, St. Michael’s Road, Aba.
- JOS: The Bible Society of Nigeria, 53, Tafawa Balewa Road, Jos.
- IBADAN: Plot 7A, Trinity Avenue, Educational Estate Samonda, Ibadan.

=== Translation Projects ===
The organization has translated the Bible into 26 Nigerian Languages.

Among the twenty-six (26) different languages the Bible has been translated are:

- Kalabari,
- Okrika,
- Isoko,
- Igala,
- Igede,
- Ebira,
- Yoruba,
- Efik,
- Igbo,
- Hausa,
- Nupe,
- Khana,
- Urhobo,
- Fulfude,
- Bokyi,
- Edo,
- Tiv,

Bura

- Itsekiri.

=== Guest Houses ===
The Bible Society of Nigeria has three guest houses located in three Nigerian cities (Lagos, Ibadan and Abuja).
