= Philipp Spener =

German Lutheran theologian (1635–1705)

The Reverend Philipp Spener
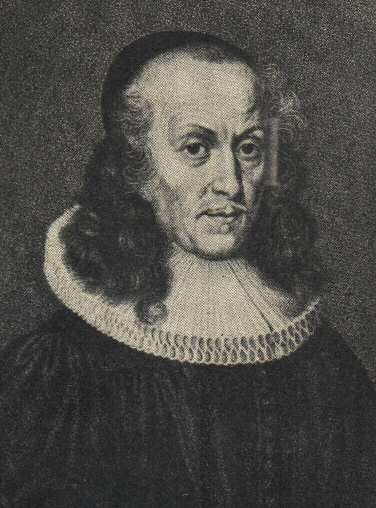
- Born: Philipp Jakob Spener; 30 January 1635; Rappoltsweiler, Upper Alsace, Holy Roman Empire
- Died: 5 February 1705 (aged 70); Berlin, Margraviate of Brandenburg, Holy Roman Empire
- Education: University of Strasbourg
- Occupations: Lutheran theologian; Pastor; Lecturer
- Movement: Pietism

Philipp Jakob Spener (23 January 1635 – 5 February 1705) was a German Lutheran theologian and pastor who essentially founded what became known as Pietism. He was later dubbed the "Father of Pietism". A prolific writer, his two main works, Pia desideria (1675) and Allgemeine Gottesgelehrtheit (1680), were published while he was the chief pastor in the Lutheran Church in Frankfurt.

In 1691, he was invited to Berlin by the court of Brandenburg. In Berlin, Spener was at odds with the predominant Lutheran orthodoxy, as he had been all his life. Spener influenced the foundation of the University of Halle. Disputing his positions, the theological faculty of Wittenberg, formally accused him of 264 errors.

== Life ==
Spener was born on 23 January 1635, in Rappoltsweiler, Upper Alsace, now part of France, in Spener's time as part of the Holy Roman Empire. After a brief time at the grammar school of Colmar, he went to Strasbourg in 1651. There he devoted himself to the study of philology, history and philosophy, and won his degree of master in 1653, with a disputation against the philosophy of Thomas Hobbes. He then became private tutor to the princes Christian and Charles of the Electorate of the Palatinate, and lectured in the university on philology and history. From 1659 to 1662, he visited the universities of Basel, Tübingen and Geneva, and commenced the study of heraldry, which he pursued throughout his life. In Geneva especially, his religious views and tendencies turned in the direction of mysticism.

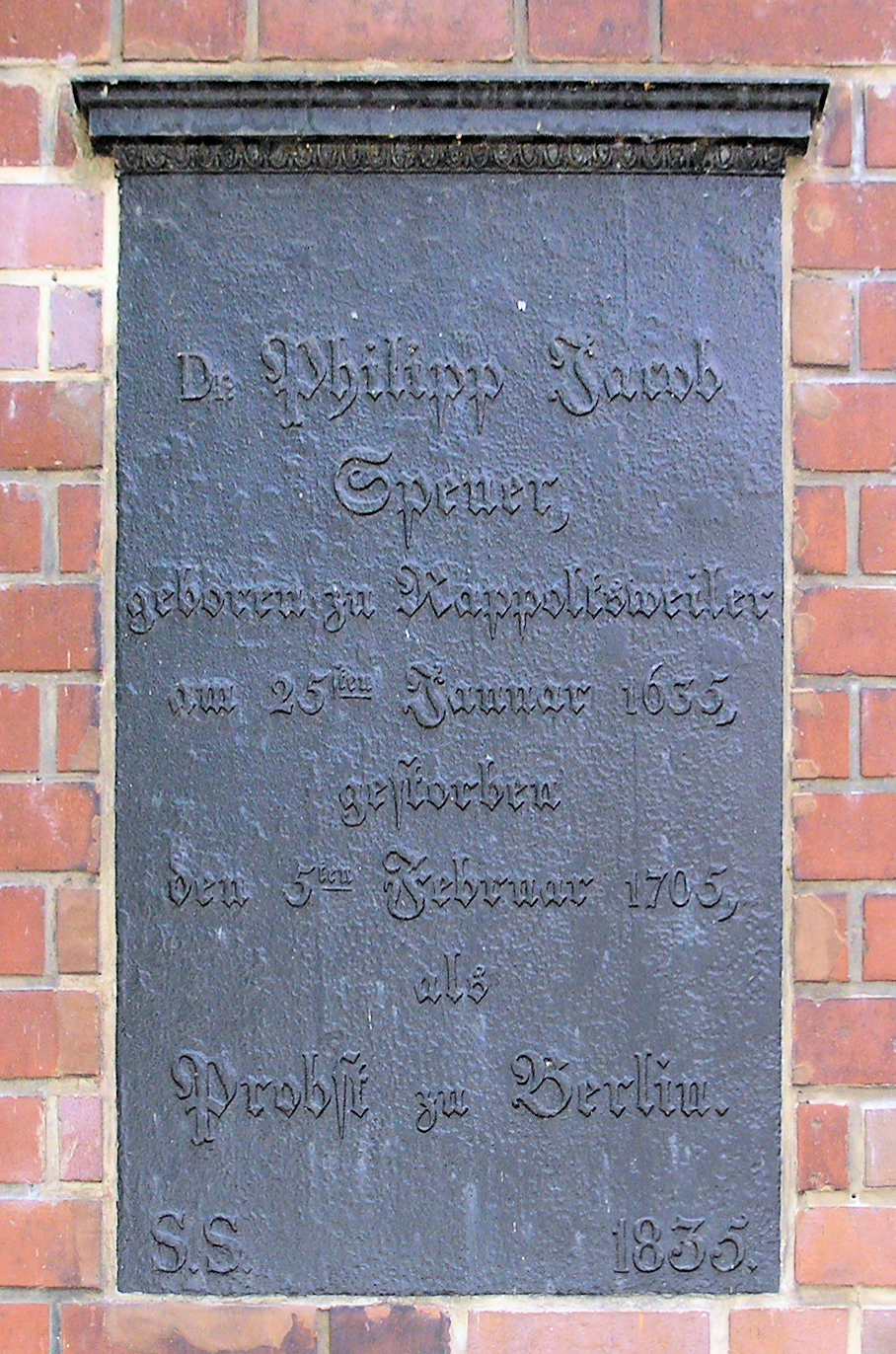
Memorial plaque on Nikolaikirchplatz in Berlin

Spener returned to Strasbourg in 1663, where he was appointed preacher without pastoral duties, with the right of holding lectures. Three years afterwards, he was invited to become the chief pastor in the Lutheran Church at Frankfurt. Here he published his two chief works, Pia desideria (1675) and Allgemeine Gottesgelehrtheit (1680), and began that form of pastoral work which resulted in the movement called Pietism.

In 1686, he accepted the invitation to the first court chaplaincy at Dresden. The Elector John George III, at whose personal desire the post had been offered to him, was soon offended when Spener condemned the morals of John George's court. Spener refused to resign his post, and the Saxon government hesitated to dismiss him. In 1691, the Saxon representative at Berlin induced the court of the March of Brandenburg to offer him the rectorship of St Nicholas in Berlin, with the title of counsellor of the Marcher Consistory (Konsistorialrat).

In Berlin, Spener was held in high honour, though the tendencies of the court and the government officials were rather rationalistic than pietistic. The University of Halle was founded under his influence in 1694. All his life, Spener had been exposed to the attacks and abuse of the orthodox Lutheran theologians. Over time, his opponents multiplied, and the movement which he started accumulated hostile criticism. In 1695, the theological faculty of Wittenberg formally accused him of 264 errors. Only his death released him from these fierce conflicts. His last important work was Theologische Bedenken (1700–1702), to which was added after his death Letzte theologische Bedenken, with a biography of Spener by CH von Canstein (1711). Spener died in Berlin, on 5 February 1705, aged 70.

== Theology ==
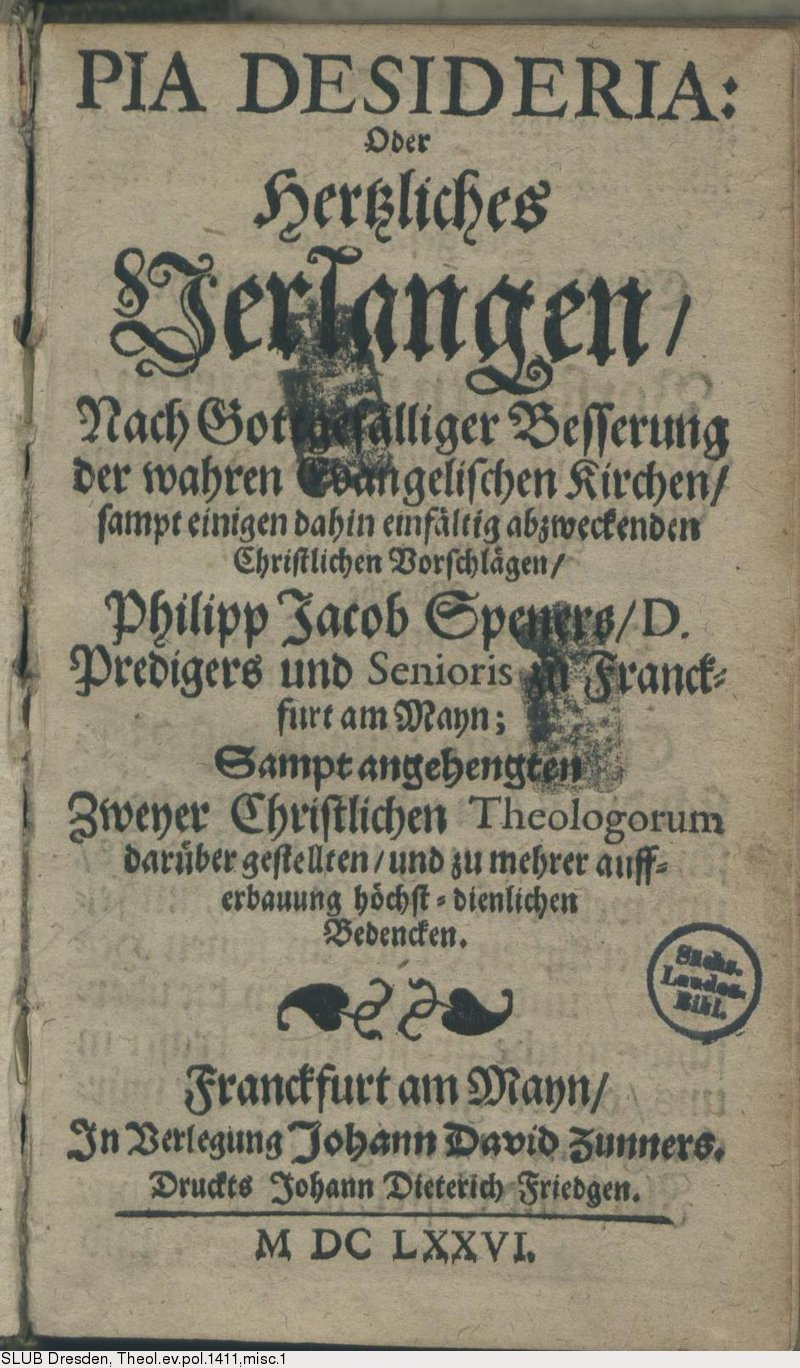
Pia Desideria

Highly influenced by Johann Arndt, Lewis Bayly, Jean de Labadie, and Theophil Großgebauer, Spener's own writings display an emphasis on personal transformation through spiritual rebirth and renewal. It is this focus on individual devotion and piety that places him within the realm of Pietism. Spener wanted to strengthen and renew the church through the development of more knowledgeable and devoted members.

In his Pia Desideria, he gave six proposals of how to enact this reform: (1) to more thoroughly acquaint believers with Scripture by means of private readings and study groups, in addition to preaching; (2) to increase the involvement of laity in all functions of the church; (3) to emphasize that believers put into practice their faith and knowledge of God; (4) to approach religious discussions with humility and love, avoiding controversy whenever possible; (5) to ensure that pastors are both well-educated and pious; and (6) to focus preaching on developing faith in ordinary believers. As these proposals indicate, Spener saw positive change for the church as being primarily dependent upon the pious involvement of individual believers.

Though Spener has been called the "father of Pietism," Albrecht Ritschl (Geschichte des Pietismus, ii. 163) maintains that "he was himself not a Pietist," as he did not advocate the quietistic, legalistic and semi-separatist practices of Pietism, though they were more or less involved in the positions he assumed or the practices which he encouraged or connived at. The only two points on which he departed from the orthodox Lutheran faith of his day were the requirement of regeneration as the sine qua non of the true theologian, and the expectation of the conversion of the Jews and the fall of the Papacy as the prelude of the triumph of the Church.

He did not, like the later Pietists, insist upon the necessity of a conscious crisis of conversion, nor did he encourage a complete breach between the Christian and the secular life. Spener was sometimes believed to be one of the godfathers of Count von Zinzendorf, the leader of the Moravian Brethren's Community at Herrnhut in Saxony. Although Zinzendorf met Spener as a child at his grandmother's home in Hennersdorf, Spener was not his godfather.

Spener was a prolific writer. The list of his published works comprises 7 vols. folio, 63 quarto, 7 octavo, 46 duodecimo. An edition of his chief writings was published by P. Grunberg in 1889. TVG Brunnen Verlag in Gießen, Germany began a new edition of Spener's works in 1996.
