= John Hayward (historian) =

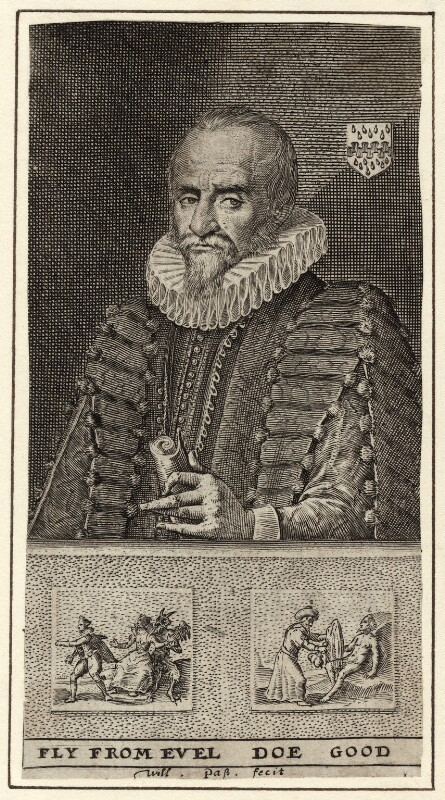
Sir John Hayward, 1630, by Willem de Passe.

Sir John Hayward (c. 1564 – 27 June 1627) was an English historian, lawyer and politician.

== Biography ==
Hayward was born at or near Felixstowe, Suffolk, where he was educated, and afterwards went to Pembroke College, Cambridge, where he was awarded BA in 1581, MA in 1584 and LLD in 1591.

In 1599 he published The First Part of the Life and Raigne of King Henrie IIII - a treatise dealing with the accession of Henry IV and the deposition of Richard II - dedicated to Robert Devereux, 2nd Earl of Essex. Queen Elizabeth and her advisers disliked the tone of the book and its dedication, and the queen ordered Francis Bacon to search for passages in it that might be drawn within a case of treason being compiled against the Earl of Essex. Specifically, Hayward was suspected of prophesying the failure of Essex's military campaign in Ireland through a description of the ill-starred efforts of Richard II in that country. On 11 July 1599, following the seizure and burning of a corrected edition of the book, Hayward was interrogated before the Star Chamber. The Queen, "argued that Hayward was pretending to be the author in order to shield 'some more mischievous' person, and that he should be racked so that he might disclose the truth". Bacon reported of the evidence for treason, "surely I find none, but for felony very many", referring to the fact that many of the sentences were stolen from Tacitus. The influence on Hayward of the works of Tacitus, which had only lately been published in English, marked a new departure in British historiography, whereby the character and behaviour of historical actors assumed a causal importance in the affairs of state. In 1600, Essex was convicted on charges of abusing his power, and in the following year of treason, whereupon he was put to death. At both trials, Hayward's book was produced in evidence. Hayward himself was remanded to the Tower in July 1600, where he remained until after the death of Elizabeth.

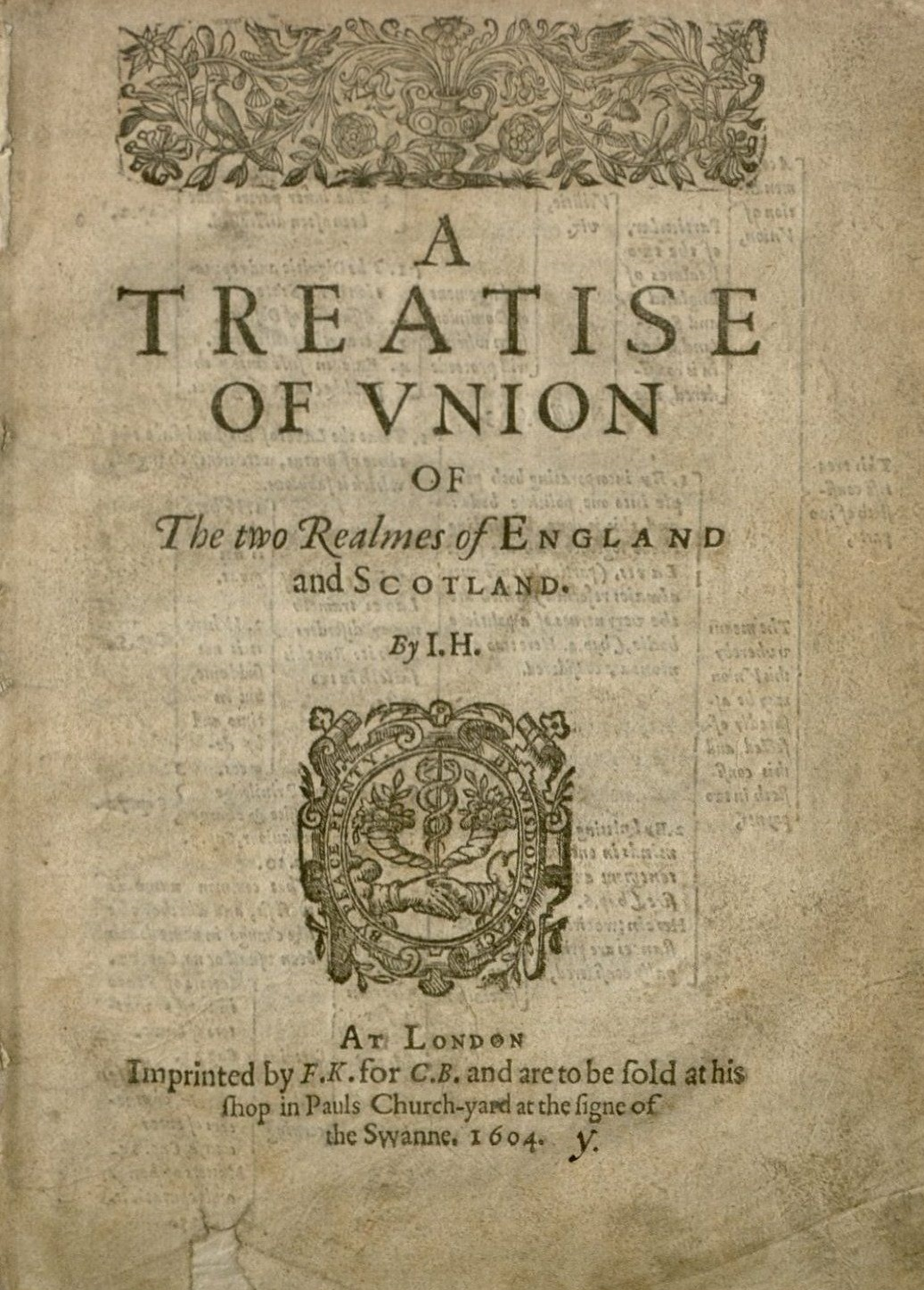
A treatise of union of the two realmes of England and Scotland, 1604

When James I came to the English throne in 1603, Hayward courted the new king's favour by publishing two pamphlets: An Answer to the first part of a certaine conference concerning succession – an argument in favour of the divine right of kings – and A Treatise of Union of England and Scotland. In 1610 Hayward was appointed one of the historiographers of the college which James founded at Chelsea. In 1613 he published his Lives of the Three Norman Kings of England, written at the request of James's son, Prince Henry. He became Chancellor of Lichfield, Staffordshire in 1615. He was a supplicant for incorporation at the University of Oxford in 1616 and became an advocate of Doctors' Commons on 5 August 1616. From 1616 to 1627 he was Master in Chancery. He was admitted at Gray's Inn on 1 August 1619 and was knighted on 9 November 1619.

Hayward died in 1627 and was buried in parish of St Bartholomew the Great, London. Among his manuscripts was found The Life and Raigne of King Edward VI, first published in 1630, and Certain Yeres of Queen Elizabeth's Raigne, the beginning of which was printed in an edition of his Edward VI, published in 1636, but which was first published in a complete form in 1840 for the Camden Society under the editorship of John Bruce, who prefixed an introduction on the life and writings of the author. His treatise on the accession of Henry IV was reprinted in 1642. His 1603 pamphlet on the Scottish succession, was reprinted in 1683 as The Right of Succession by the friends of the Duke of York during the struggle over the Exclusion Bill.

Hayward was conscientious and diligent in obtaining information, and although his reasoning on questions of morality is often childish, his descriptions are generally graphic and vigorous. Notwithstanding his imprisonment under Elizabeth, his portrait of the qualities of the queen's mind and person is flattering rather than detractive. He also wrote several works of a devotional character. During his confinement in the Tower, he published The Sanctuarie of a Troubled Soule (1601), which went through a dozen editions and issues. Other similar works proved equally popular, and he was acclaimed as, "a learned and godly man, being better read in theological authors than in those belonging to his own profession."
