= TU Dresden School of International Studies =

The School of International Studies (Zentrum für Internationale Studien, ZIS in German) is a central scientific institution of TU Dresden, founded in January 2002 in Dresden.

== Course of Studies ==
In October 2002, the school took over the sponsorship of the course of study of International Relations. The interdisciplinary program combines the subjects of international politics, international economics and international law. The program was founded in 1998/99 as the only Bachelor's degree of international relations in Germany. However, the University of St. Gallen in Switzerland offers a similar degree, while other German universities only offer Master's degrees. Of the steadily growing number of applicants (892 applied for the winter semester 2009/10), only 36 are admitted to the program each year. These are selected through a multi-phased process in which study contenders have to pass comprehensive written and oral tests on relevant international issues as well as language skills in both English and either French or Spanish.

== Goals ==
The ZIS coordinates the program and 2 master's degrees, one with a focus on "Global Political Economy" and one on "International Organizations and Institutions" as well as the participating departments for law, political science and economics. The school is committed to international cooperation with universities around the world and close contacts with research institutions and the private sector in order to promote the program and research in the field of international relations.

== See also ==
- TU Dresden
- Dresden
- Dresden International University
- International relations
