= Louis Cousin =

French translator and journalist (1627–1707)

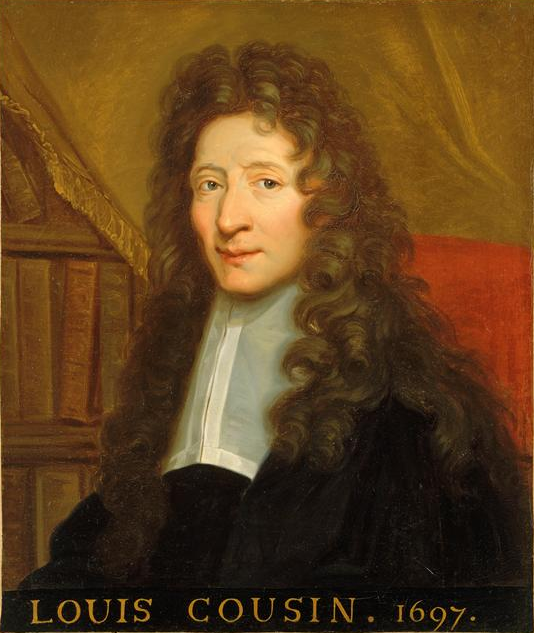
Louis Cousin

Louis Cousin, le président Cousin (French pronunciation: [lwi kuzɛ̃]; 21 August 1627 – 26 February 1707) was a French translator, historian, lawyer, royal censor and president of the cour des monnaies.

Cousin was born and died in Paris. He was the third member elected to occupy seat 3 of the Académie française in 1697.

== Bibliography ==
- Histoire de Constantinople depuis le règne de Justin jusqu’à la fin de l'Empire, traduite sur les originaux grecs par Cousin (8 volumes, 1672–1685)
- Histoire de l'Église, écrite par Eusèbe, traduite par M. Cousin (4 volumes, 1675–1676)
- Les Principes et les règles de la vie chrétienne, traité composé en latin par M. le cardinal Bona et traduit en françois par M. Cousin (1675)
- Histoire romaine, écrite par Xiphilin, par Zonare et par Zosime, traduite sur les originaux grecs par M. Cousin (1678)
- Histoire de l'Empire d'Occident de Xiphilin, traduite par le président Cousin (2 volumes, 1683)
- Discours de Clément Alexandrin pour exhorter les payens à embrasser la religion chrétienne, traduit par Mr Cousin (1684)
- Discours d'Eusèbe, touchant les miracles attribués par les payens à Apollonius de Thyane, traduit par M. Cousin (1684)
- La Morale de Confucius, philosophe de la Chine (1688). Attribué. Texte en ligne
- Histoire de plusieurs saints des maisons des comtes de Tonnerre et de Clermont (1698)

== Bibliography ==
- "Louis Cousin (1627-1707): Élu en 1697 au fauteuil 3". Académie française. 2009. Archived from the original on 2009-02-08.
