= Carl Hildebrand von Canstein =

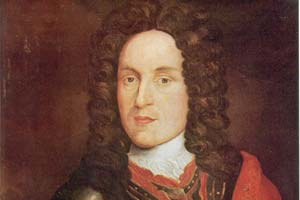
Von Canstein

Carl or Karl Hildebrand von Canstein (4 August 1667 – 19 August 1719), Baron or Count of Canstein, was a German aristocrat who founded the Canstein Bible Institute (German: Cansteinsche Bibelanstalt) in Halle, Brandenburg-Prussia, the first modern Bible society.

== Life ==
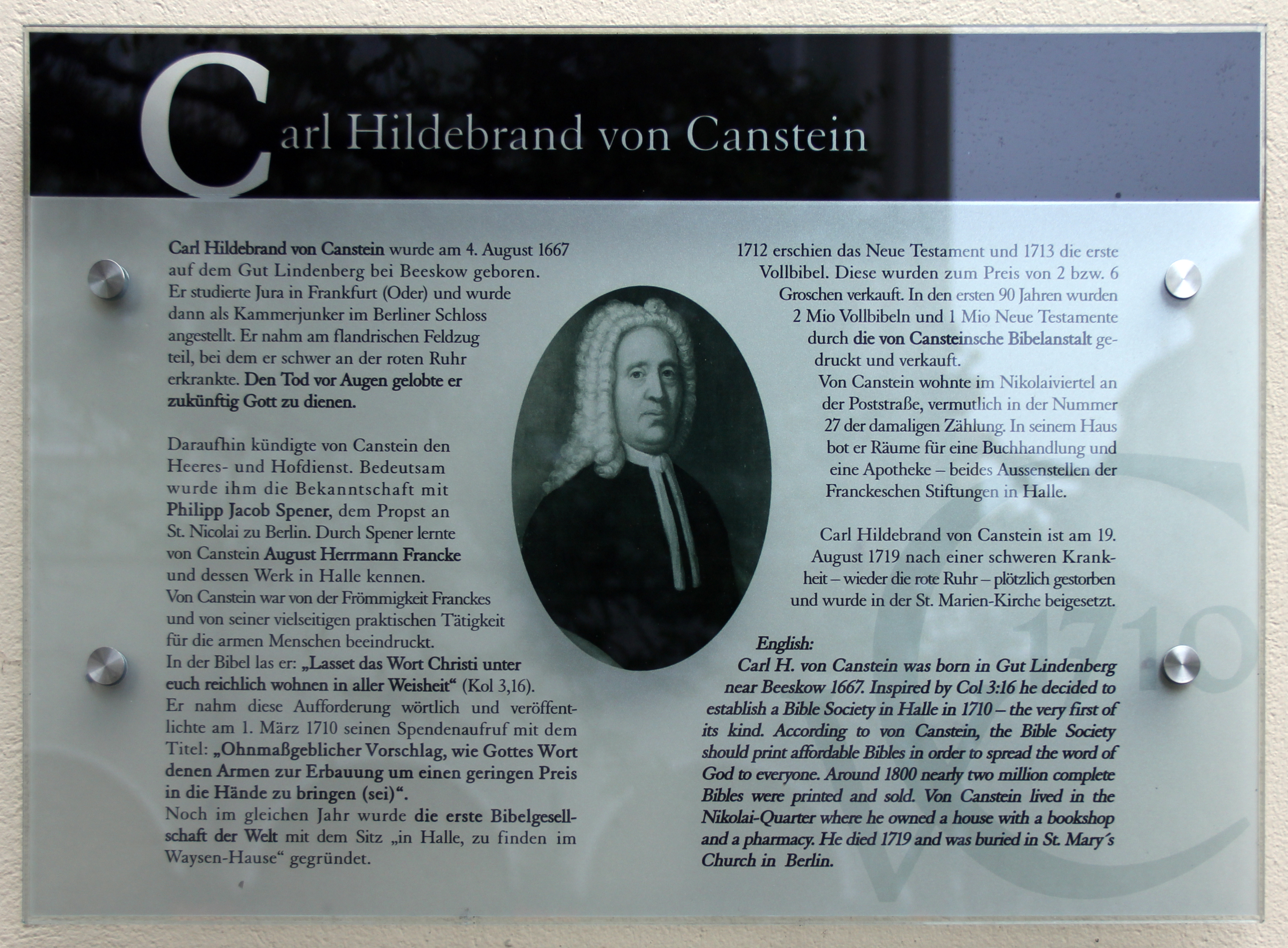
A memorial plaque in Von Canstein's honor in Berlin.

He was born at Lindenberg on 4 August 1667. He studied law at Alma Mater Viadrina in Frankfurt-on-the-Oder and, upon finishing his courses, he toured the Netherlands, England, France, Italy, and southern Germany from 1686 to 1688. On the death of the Great Elector Frederick William, he returned to Berlin.

He was made a gentleman of the bedchamber in 1689 but resigned to volunteer with the Brandenburger troops sent to Flanders in the Nine Years' War. While there, he fell seriously ill and became religious. Upon his return to Berlin, he devoted himself to philanthropy.

In 1691, he befriended Philipp Spener and August Hermann Francke, who convinced him to establish the Canstein Bible Institute for the purpose of using stereotype printing to reduce the price of German bibles. Raising money via subscriptions, he published a 2-groschen New Testament at Halle in 1712 and a 6-groschen full Bible in 1713. Within his lifetime, he published about 100,000 New Testaments in 28 editions and about 40,000 full Bibles in 8 octavo and 8 duodecimo editions.

He died at Berlin on 19 August 1719.

== Legacy ==
Von Canstein's Bible society was the first of its kind and broadly copied within Germany and abroad. He was succeeded at the Bible Institute by Francke. The institute's buildings were expanded in 1727 and the Cansteinische Buckdruckerei established in 1734–35. Polish and Czech editions were printed in 1722, and Wendish and Lithuanian in 1868 and 1869; in 1892, the institute printed the first revised version of Luther's Bible.

He is sometimes credited with the popularization of stereotype printing.

== Works ==
In addition to a biography of Spener, Von Canstein wrote:

- Ohnmassgebender Vorschlag, wie Gotteswort den Armen zur Erbauung um Einen Geringen Preis in die Hande zu Bringen Sei (in German), Berlin, 1710.
- Harmonic und Auslegung der Heiligen Vier Evangelisten (in German), Halle, 1718.
