= Bible in the Schools =

US non-profit organization

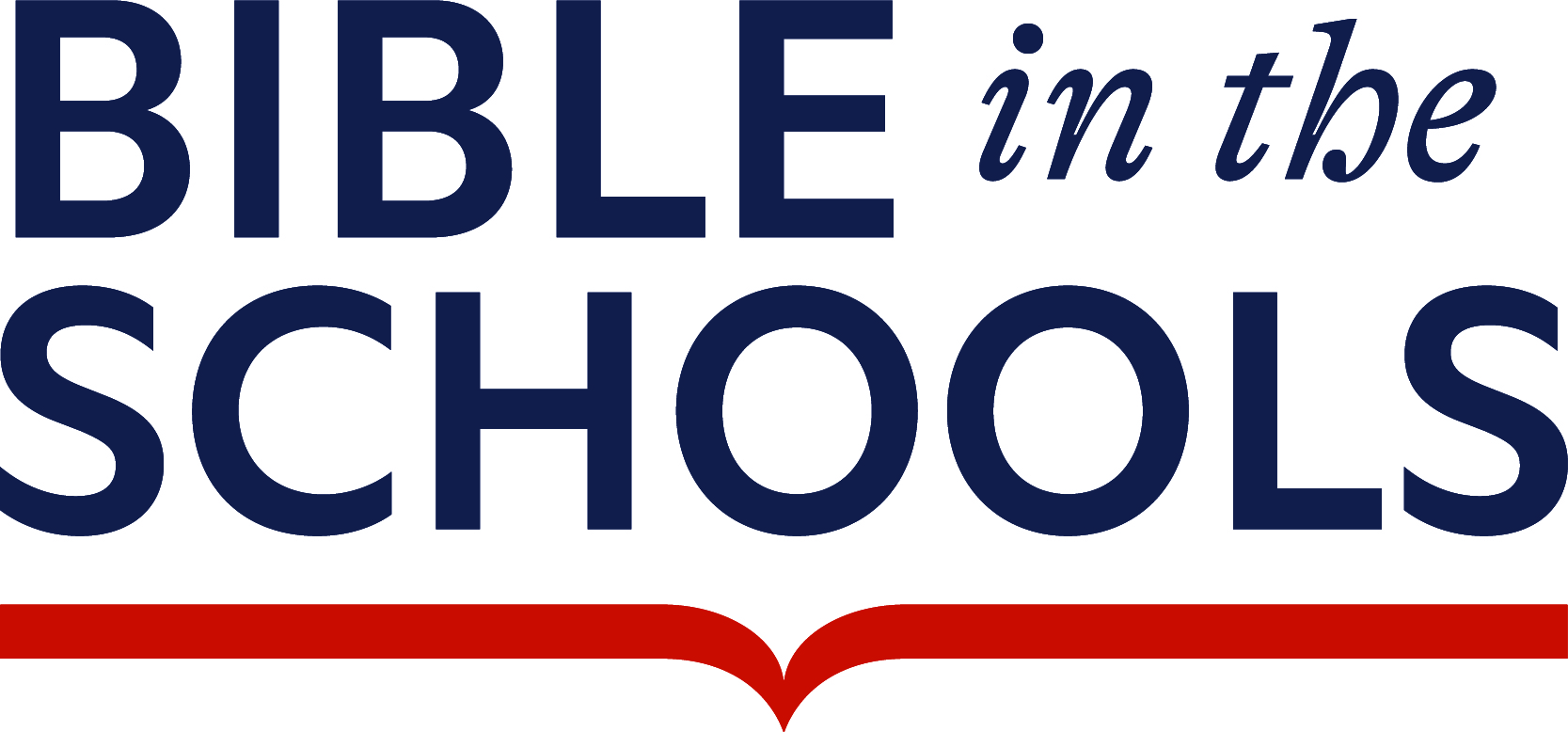
- Founded: 1922
- Founder: Dr. J. Park McCallie
- Type: 501(c)(3)
- Location: Chattanooga, Tennessee
- Region served: Hamilton County, Tennessee
- Method: Provides funding grants to the Hamilton County Department of Education for full cost of elective Bible teachers.
- Key people: Cathy Scott, President
- Website: bibleintheschools.com

Bible in the Schools is a 501(c)(3) not-for-profit located in Chattanooga, Tennessee, that promotes biblical literacy in Hamilton County.

Bible elective courses are funded entirely by the generosity of private charitable contributions through Bible in the Schools, a 501(c)(3). No tax dollars are used. Hamilton County Schools was reimbursed over $2.3 million for the complete cost of the countywide Bible program in 32 schools during the 2023–2024 academic year. Included in reimbursement costs are: teacher salaries, benefits, taxes, Bibles, classroom supplies, and year-round teacher professional development, compliance training, and other resources. Bible courses are a free gift from the community to participating public schools in Hamilton County, serving students in grades 6–12. For the 2024–2025 academic year, Bible in the Schools will fund 35 teachers in 33 schools, to a projected amount of $2.8 million. The Bible program seeks equal access for all students.

Five elective courses are offered in 33 participating middle and high schools (grades 6–12). All courses are taught in compliance with the Tennessee State Board of Education Bible Standards.

== History ==
In 1922, J. P. McCallie, a co-founder of The McCallie School and chair of the Religious Work Committee of the Chattanooga YMCA, approached the Chattanooga City Commission to provide Bible courses adapted to the various ages from 4th grade through high school, taught by teachers selected and paid by the Bible Study Committee, and that were subject to the principals and the Board of Education in scholarship and discipline. The program was approved and later expanded into the Hamilton County Schools. In the 2020–2021 academic year, 4,615 public school students took a Bible course.

Since 1922, Bible in the Schools has provided Hamilton County public school students in grades 6–12 with the opportunity to study the Bible in their classrooms. These courses, offered as electives, allow students to study the Bible from a literary and historical perspective. The Bible program consists of five elective courses taught from a viewpoint-neutral, court-approved curriculum. Electives are funded entirely by generous donors from Hamilton County and beyond. The Hamilton County Bible program is inclusive to students from all walks of life and seeks equal access for all public school students.
