= Theophil Großgebauer =

German theologian

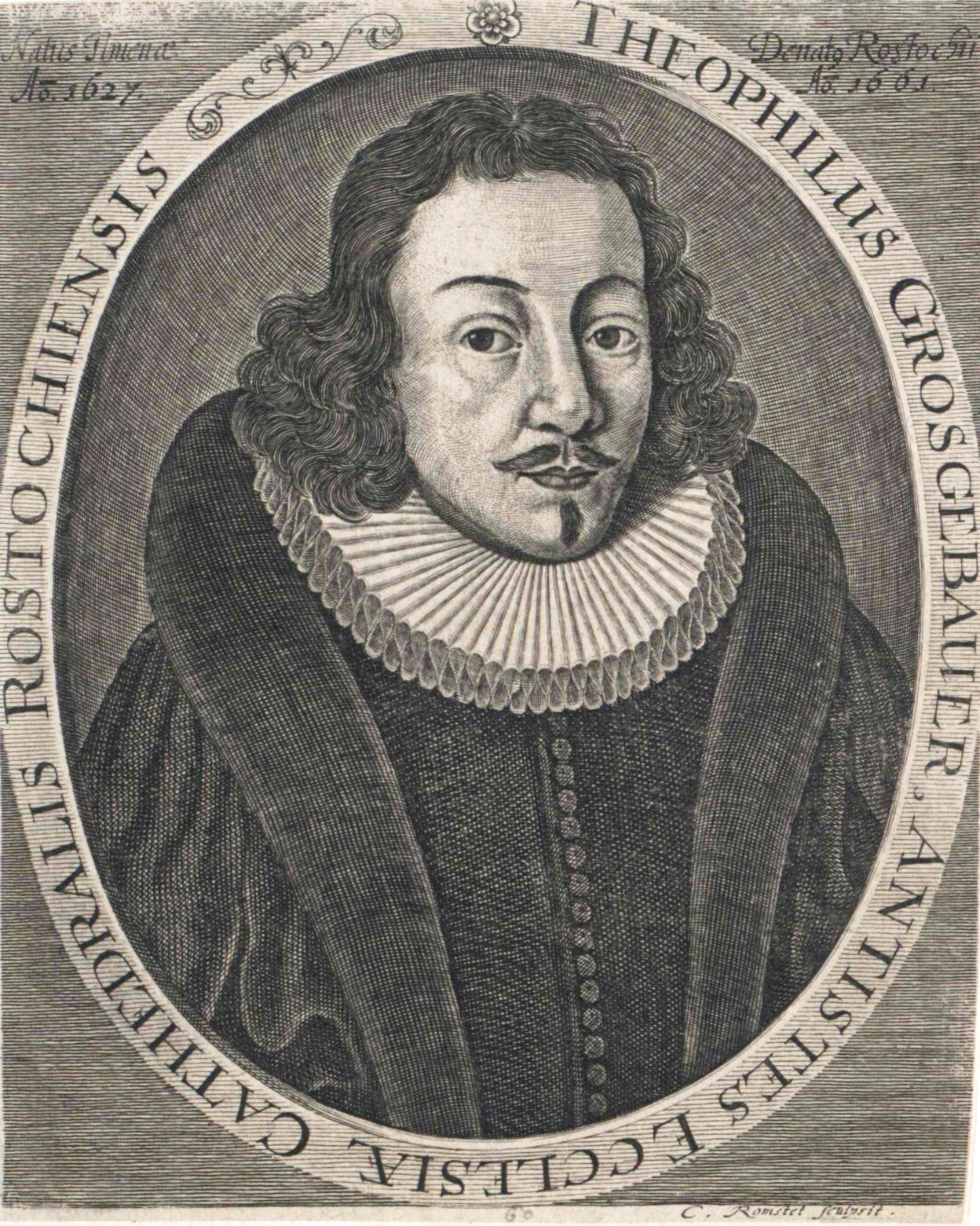
Theophil Großgebauer

Theophil Großgebauer (24 November 1627, Ilmenau – 8 July 1661, Rostock) was a German Lutheran theologian active at the University of Rostock, most notable for his work Wächterstimme aus dem verwüsteten Zion.

== Sources ==
- http://www.theologie.uni-rostock.de/index.php?id=3551
