= The Tailenders =

- Written by: Adele Horne
- Directed by: Adele Horne

Production
- Producer: Adele Horne
- Running time: 72 minutes

Original release
- Network: PBS
- Release: 2005

The Tailenders is a 2005 documentary directed, produced and narrated by Adele Horne, an American independent filmmaker based out of Los Angeles. It is in limited release and has been screened in the U.S., Mexico and Scotland. According to a P.O.V. press release, The Tailenders was broadcast nationally in the US on PBS on Tuesday, July 25, 2006.

The film follows Gospel Recordings, an evangelical Christian missionary group founded by Joy Ridderhof in California in 1939 to make audio recordings of Bible stories in every language on Earth. The group is part of the umbrella network GRN - Global Recordings Network which has sister offices in over 30 countries. The film claims there are over 8,000 languages and dialects in the world and, as of the making of the film, Global Recordings Network has recorded Bible stories in 5,485 of them. It is mentioned in the film that their archive houses more spoken languages in one place than any other single area in the world. The significance of this lies in the notion that the Bible is not only the most published book around the world, passages from it are also translated into the most spoken languages as well. Many of the languages utilized by Gospel Recordings do not have written counterparts, and even if they did, most who spoke the languages would not be able to read it anyway. A benefit of this group's work is the growing set of unspoken languages that are catalogued over the years, which act as a strong counterpart to historical records of various cultures. "The Tailenders" claim that half of all languages occur in eight countries.

Global Recordings Network, founded in Los Angeles in 1939, specifically targets indigenous people in remote areas of the world. In the years of 2002 and 2003 the organization prearranged trips to The Solomon Islands, Mexico, and India. Three countries termed the "tailenders" since they were the last group of people to be reached by missionaries transmitting the message of God, unchanged. In the three countries mentioned earlier, there are a total of 769 different languages and dialects spoken, 74 in The Solomon Islands, 295 in Mexico, and 400 in India.

The film attempts to explore the connection between missionary activity and global capitalism by using low-tech audio devices to speak to communities that face economic crisis. The missionaries targeted these communities that were in crisis because they found that displaced and desperate people were more receptive to evangelical recordings. Also because these people were more interested in the audio recordings because they were more comfortable with listening to their native language. It seems to provide an interesting view on mass-evangelization as the filmmaker shows the viewer that by placing a concentrated emphasis on these native people and using a recording of their own language as a way of connection to Christianity; to make them feel comfortable in learning a new way of thinking about the world.

== The role of technology in the film ==
The makers of the documentary emphasize the strategy of reaching and giving communication technology to those facing hardships in their very own land. For example: the communities in Patutiva, Solomon Islands faced the threat of logging which would consequently lead to no water, homes, and the destruction of the native ecosystem. The narrator of the documentary also seeks to explain why the devices they used to spread the gospel message were so effective. "Separated from its body, a voice become superhuman," she explains, "It can speak to more people than any single person could." The native tongue on the recordings allowed Global Recordings Network to bring a source of comfort and trust for people who have been long separated from their homeland. They used the inherent appeal of the medium to gain converts. The film "has presented disembodied audio as a religion unto itself."

Because of the low development in these places, devices had to be used that could work without the use of electricity. The devices they used to are referred to as "Hand Crank" and consisted of cardboard record players and hand cranked cassette players. They take apart pieces of technology and re-assemble them in order to make the technology serve their purposes. They used people within the cultures who understood and spoke the different dialects in order to record the stories they wanted to share from the Bible. To make sure that the stories were authentic, translators were used.

The "Hand Crank" cassette players were a tool of attraction in itself. They were made with deliberately bold colored buttons that would attract the attention of the children. The "Hand Crank" would even attract the adults who have never been exposed to the missionaries before. The missionaries also made it a point to charge the people of these poor third world nations for the cassettes made by The Global Recording Network. The missionaries felt that the people valued the messages on the tape and the tape itself more when they have to purchase it, rather them being handed the tapes free.

== Global evangelism and human language ==
The Global Recordings Network worked to translate the biblical messages and songs into every language possible. They trained recordists to choose the most appropriate scripts in order to appeal most to specific groups of people. They had scripts prepared to target many different groups from spirit-worshipers to Muslims or Buddhists. Recordists go into villages and conduct interviews with community members in order to decide which scripts would be most appropriate to gain converts in that area. The final products of the scripts that are recorded appeal to the specific groups of people because the "Spirit" speaks through background noises such as children's voices, bugs, and other sounds that relate to their cultural environment.

The missionaries developed a diagnostic procedure to determine a person's exact native language or dialect. They did so by playing audio samples in differing dialects until the individuals heard their native language. Finding their exact language helps the people relate back to their homeland because most of them have been uprooted to find jobs. These people are in need of something to fall back on and these biblical recordings helps them relate and continue their faith.

An example of this includes their trip to a poor village in India. The documentary focused on one older Indian couple that were having financial troubles. The wife leaves at 7 a.m. every morning and returns at 5 p.m. every night. The wage she earns is less than a dollar for a 10-hour work day. The husband is unable to work because of a medical condition called 'vertigo'. Employers did not hire him due to this, and thus, he cannot make any money. The missionaries talked to the husband.

== The effectiveness of audio native-language evangelism ==
Some common problems that they encountered were language mix-ups and background noise. Although these problems were serious to the spread of their message, it seemed foolish that the devices were given to people who were so poor that they could not afford to fix holes in their roofs The missionaries purposely sold the tapes for monetary value so they would value the tapes and listen to them more. Along those lines when the recipients that were given the technology asked for other assistance, the givers simply told them they would "pray for them."

More problems include the fact that some messages get lost in translation. An example of this was clearly shown in the documentary when they played a popular children's game called "telephone." The sentence, "Air carries the vibration to the recording device" was passed in English from one person to the next, who then passed it along in Hindi, then Nepali, then Manipuri, then Tangkhul, then Manipuri, and then back to English. At this point, it became "When we record the language, after we record, it's come out...its come out through the vibration." One short sentence became a long, descriptive passage with a slightly altered meaning. When one story or message gets translated into over 500 languages, the emphasis may shift, and meanings may differ. Different words mean different things to different people in different cultures.

The missionaries often picked translators who spoke clearly and had knowledge of the local language to help them record the Bible passages. Some of the translators used by the missionaries would take liberties with the translations that deviated from the core message. For example, one translator told a fictitious Bible story about a pig. The missionaries were not aware of this until later when they played the finished tape for someone else who spoke the same language.

The work of the GRN is controversial in some of the communities they work in. In Oaxaca, some community leaders noted that converts often become less willing to engage in community projects to increase social welfare, instead focusing on bettering their own family's situation and praying for everyone else.

At the end of the film, the narrator explains the effect of the missionaries work, saying, "the strongest message received may be the technology itself. An emblem of wealthy machine culture and its power. To convert is to be joined to this power."

== Reactions ==
Colin Stott, the US Director of Global Recordings Network (GRN), the organization whose efforts are the subject of "The Tailenders," has expressed displeasure at the way the film depicted his organization. In an open letter, Stott condemned filmmaker Adele Horne for her "skewed perspective" on the work GRN does. He says that Horne's finished work misrepresents the organization's motives, competence, and their ability to effectively spread the word of the Bible, which is their mission. Furthermore, Stott claims that Horne did not make changes requested by GRN and that his organization did not sponsor or authorize the film.

The critical response to the film was very positive, although some reviewers criticized the interpretation provided by the voice-over. The Wall Street Journal noted, "Annoyingly, the documentary is interrupted by the cryptic and often political musings of filmmaker Adele Horne."

== Awards ==
- "Axium Truer Than Fiction Award," Film Independent's 2007 Spirit Awards
- National PBS Broadcast on P.O.V.
- Documentary Fortnight, Museum of Modern Art

== Screenings ==
This movie deals directly with course content from a University of Illinois course called Speech Communications 199B (Communication Technology and Society) taught by Professor Christian Sandvig. In this course topics are covered that correlate with ideas behind different forms of technology and their effectiveness in presenting different messages.

A screening of the film was required of each student enrolled in the course. Two screenings were April 3 and 4, 2007 on the University of Illinois campus. Few people attended the first screening of the film on April 3.

Other students, besides those in Professor Sandvig's class, attended the filming simply for pleasure. Advertising for the screenings was through fliers that Professor Sandvig and other Speech Communications students put up around campus.

The film is available at the Media & Reserve Services at the university's Undergraduate library, where it can be viewed in a media viewing cubicle.

== Credits ==
- Written, Produced And Directed by Adele Horne
- Editing by Catherine Hollander, Adele Horne
- Sound Design by Maile Colbert
- Sound Recording
  - Rebecca Baron
  - Beth Bird
  - James Uribe
  - Yolanda Cruz
- Cinematography in the Solomon Islands, Mexico and India Adele Horne
- Cinematography in California
  - Shana Hagan
  - Leo Chiang
  - Adele Horne
- Consulting Producer Laura Nix
- Solomon Islands Pijin Interview Jones Sanga
- Spanish-Language Interviews
  - Beth Bird
  - Yolanda Cruz
  - James Uribe
- Archival Image Research Maryam Kashani and Sophie Ohara
- Translation Raquel Cruz and Jigyasa Taneja
- Transcription Richard Brenin
- Sound Mix Barking Dog Sound
- Online Color Correction Christopher Gray Postproduction
- Music From Evan Ziporyn:
  - This Is Not A Clarinet, available on Cantaloupe Music, California, 21002
  - "Partial Truths"
  - "Four Impersonations
