= List of best-selling albums =

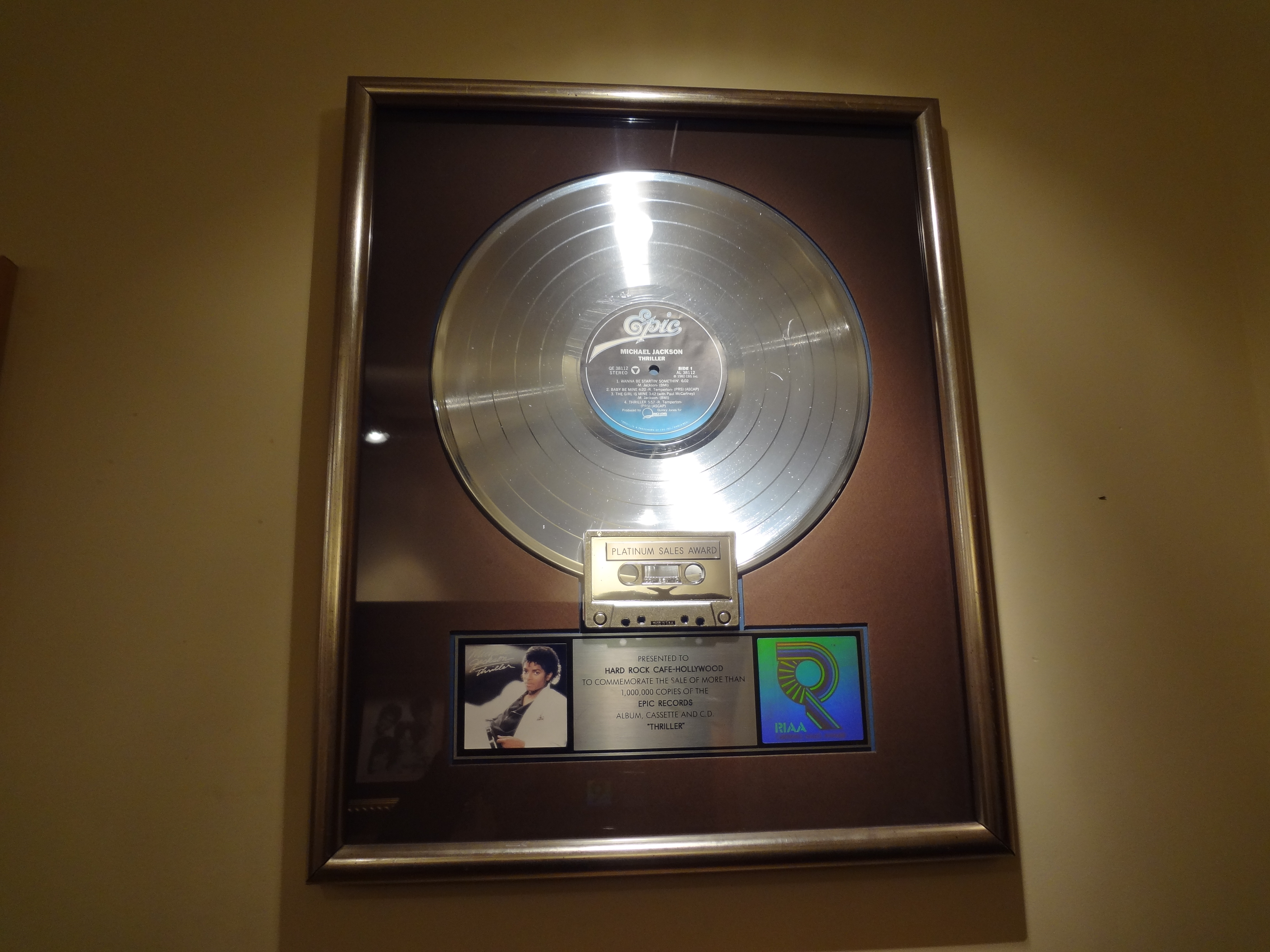
Platinum record for Michael Jackson's Thriller (1982), the best-selling album of all time

This is a list of the world's best-selling albums of recorded music in physical mediums, such as vinyl, audio cassettes or compact discs. To appear on the list, the figure must have been published by a reliable source and the album must have sold at least 20 million copies and certified at least 10 million units (the equivalent of a diamond certification by the RIAA). (Note: Certification systems have been established periodically throughout the past half century; thus, certification databases are not able to cover all sales. Some (or all) records released and sold prior to a certification system's establishment year may not be found within the available searchable certification databases. Year of establishment (from largest market to smallest based on Retail Value each market generates respectively): United States: 1958; Japan: 1989; Germany: 1975; United Kingdom: 1973; France: 1973; Canada: 1975; Australia: 1997 (Note: (online certification-database has begun since 1990. Certifications; however, existed in Australia since the 1970s.)); Brazil: 1990; Netherlands: 1978; Italy: 2009 (Note: (online certification-database covers certifications issued since 2009. Certifications; however, have existed in Italy since the 1980s.)); Spain: 1979; Sweden: 1987; Norway: 1993; Denmark: 2001 (Note: (online certifications for Denmark start from 2001. Certifications; however, existed in Denmark since the early 1990s.)); Switzerland: 1989; Mexico: 1999; Argentina: 1980; Belgium: 1995; Austria: 1990; Poland: 1995; Finland: 1971; Ireland: 2005; New Zealand: July 1978; Portugal: 2004 (Note: (online certification-database covers certifications issued since 2004. Certifications; however, have existed in Portugal since the 1980s.))) This list can contain any types of album, including studio albums, extended plays, greatest hits, compilations, various artists, soundtracks and remixes. The figures given do not take into account the resale of used albums. Certified copies are sourced either from available online databases of local music industry associations or a country with an established certifying authority (see List of music recording certifications).

As a result of the methodology that the American and Canadian certification-awarding bodies (the RIAA and Music Canada respectively) use, each disc in a multi-disc set is counted as one unit toward certification, leading to some double albums on the list—such as Pink Floyd's The Wall—being certified with a number double the number of copies sold there. Such albums have the certifications for the number of copies (not discs) shipped indicated. Conversely, the American certification level for double albums that fit onto one compact disc, such as the Saturday Night Fever soundtrack reflect the actual number of copies sold. In 2016, RIAA included streaming in addition to track sales and album sales based on the concept of album-equivalent unit for certification purposes, and certification therefore no longer reflects shipment alone. For example, in the update of the certification for Their Greatest Hits (1971–1975) by the Eagles in August 2018, the album was certified 38× Platinum (increasing from the previous 29× Platinum certification in 2006) based on the new criteria, making it then the album with the highest certification in the United States.

Michael Jackson's Thriller, estimated to have sold 70 million copies worldwide, is the best-selling album ever. Jackson also has the highest number of albums on the list with five, Celine Dion has four, while the Beatles, Madonna, Whitney Houston and Pink Floyd each have three.

Groupings are based on different sales benchmarks, the highest being for claims of at least 40 million copies, and the lowest being for claims of 20–29 million copies. Albums are listed in order of number of copies sold. If two or more artists have the same claimed sales, they are then ranked by certified units and thereafter by the artist's last name. Markets' order within the table is based on the number of compact discs sold in each market, largest market at the top and smallest at the bottom.

== Legend ==
Colors
Studio albums
Greatest hits and compilations
Soundtracks
Live albums

== 40 million copies or more ==
*All sales figures are shown in millions

Artist	Album	Released	Genre	Total certified copies (from available markets)*	Reported sales*	Ref.
Michael Jackson	Thriller	1982	Pop, post-disco, funk, rock	51.4: US: 34 million; JPN: 100,000; UK: 4.5 million; GER: 1.5 million; FRA: 1 million; CAN: 3 million; AUS: 1.19 million; MEX: 2.6 million; NLD: 800,000; ITA: 250,000; SWE: 400,000; ARG: 500,000; SWI: 300,000; AUT: 400,000; FIN: 119,061; NZ: 180,000; HKG: 15,000; DEN: 580,000; HUN: 6,000; POR: 40,000	70	
AC/DC	Back in Black	1980	Hard rock	31.2: US: 27 million; UK: 1 million; GER: 1 million; FRA: 600,000; CAN: 1 million; AUS: 840,000; ITA: 150,000; SPA: 150,000; BRA: 100,000; DEN: 40,000; ARG: 160,000; SWI: 100,000; AUT: 50,000; POL: 10,000; NZ: 90,000	50	
Whitney Houston / Various artists	The Bodyguard	1992	R&B, soul, pop	29.7: US: 19 million; JPN: 2 million; UK: 2.1 million; GER: 1.5 million; FRA: 1 million; CAN: 1 million; AUS: 350,000; BRA: 750,000; NLD: 100,000; ITA: 25,000; SWE: 100,000; SPA: 600,000; ARG: 240,000; BEL: 200,000; POL: 50,000; SWI: 250,000; AUT: 200,000; NOR: 200,000; FIN: 56,486; NZ: 15,000	45	
Pink Floyd	The Dark Side of the Moon	1973	Progressive rock	25.7: US: 15 million; UK: 4.8 million; GER: 1.5 million; FRA: 400,000; CAN: 2 million; AUS: 980,000; ITA: 400,000; ARG: 240,000; BEL: 25,000; POL: 100,000; AUT: 100,000; NZ: 240,000	45	
Eagles	Their Greatest Hits (1971–1975)	1976	Country rock, soft rock, folk rock	43.2: US: 40 million; UK: 600,000; CAN: 2 million; AUS: 560,000; HKG: 15,000	44	
Eagles	Hotel California	1976	Soft rock	33.8: US: 28 million; UK: 1.8 million; GER: 500,000; FRA: 1 million; CAN: 1 million; AUS: 630,000; NLD: 100,000; ITA: 25,000; SPA: 400,000; DEN: 10,000; SWI: 200,000; AUT: 25,000; FIN: 30,933; NZ: 135,000; HKG: 15,000	42	
Shania Twain	Come On Over	1997	Country, pop	30.7: US: 20 million; JPN: 100,000; UK: 3.6 million; GER: 750,000; FRA: 300,000; CAN: 2 million; AUS: 1.750 million; BRA: 100,000; MEX: 100,000; NLD: 500,000; SWE: 240,000; SPA: 100,000; DEN: 140,000; ARG: 120,000; BEL: 150,000; SWI: 150,000; AUT: 25,000; NOR: 300,000; FIN: 38,958; NZ: 315,000	40	
Fleetwood Mac	Rumours	1977	Soft rock	30.3: US: 21 million; UK: 4.5 million; GER: 1.25 million; FRA: 300,000; CAN: 2 million; AUS: 910,000; NLD: 100,000; ITA: 25,000; SPA: 50,000; DEN: 40,000; NZ: 195,000; HKG: 15,000	40	
Meat Loaf	Bat Out of Hell	1977	Hard rock, glam rock, progressive rock	22: US: 14 million; UK: 3.3 million; GER: 500,000; CAN: 2 million; AUS: 1.820 million; NLD: 100,000; DEN: 40,000; SWI: 25,000; NOR: 25,000; NZ: 255,000	40	
Bee Gees / Various artists	Saturday Night Fever	1977	Disco	22.1: US: 16 million; UK: 2.1 million; GER: 1.5 million; FRA: 200,000; CAN: 1.4 million; AUS: 770,000; NLD: 100,000; ITA: 25,000; HKG: 15,000	40	

== 30–39 million copies ==
*All sales figures are shown in millions

Artist	Album	Released	Genre	Total certified copies (from available markets)*	Claimed sales*	Ref.
Led Zeppelin	Led Zeppelin IV	1971	Hard rock,folk rock	30.4: US: 24 million; UK: 1.8 million; GER: 750,000; FRA: 600,000; CAN: 2 million; AUS: 630,000; BRA: 250,000; NLD: 100,000; ITA: 50,000; SPA: 100,000; NOR: 40,000; ARG: 60,000; SWI: 50,000	37	
Michael Jackson	Bad	1987	Pop, R&B, funk, rock	21.5: US: 11 million; JPN: 100,000; UK: 4.2 million; GER: 2 million; FRA: 1 million; CAN: 1,000,000; AUS: 420,000; NLD: 100,000; SPA: 300,000; SWE: 200,000; DEN: 80,000; NOR: 100,000; MEX: 350,000; SWI: 100,000; AUT: 200,000; FIN: 51,287; NZ: 135,000; HKG: 15,000; POR: 40,000; ITA: 100,000	35	
Alanis Morissette	Jagged Little Pill	1995	Alternative rock	26.4: US: 17 million; UK: 3 million; GER: 1 million; FRA: 300,000; CAN: 2 million; AUS: 980,000; BRA: 500,000; NLD: 400,000; SPA: 300,000; SWE: 200,000; DEN: 180,000; ARG: 60,000; BEL: 100,000; POL: 50,000; SWI: 50,000; NOR: 50,000; AUT: 100,000; FIN: 65,860; NZ: 15,000; POR: 80,000	33	
Various artists	Dirty Dancing	1987	Pop, rock, R&B	24.1: US: 14 million; UK: 3 million; GER: 3.250 million; FRA: 1 million; CAN: 1 million; AUS: 770,000; BRA: 100,000; NLD: 100,000; ITA: 25,000; SPA: 400,000; SWE: 100,000; DEN: 60,000; POL: 50,000; SWI: 250,000; NZ: 15,000; HKG: 7,500	32	
Celine Dion	Falling into You	1996	Pop, soft rock	21.1: US: 12 million; JPN: 800,000; UK: 2.1 million; GER: 1.25 million; FRA: 1 million; CAN: 1 million; AUS: 910,000; BRA: 100,000; NLD: 600,000; SPA: 200,000; SWE: 200,000; DEN: 160,000; ARG: 60,000; BEL: 200,000; POL: 100,000; SWI: 150,000; NOR: 150,000; AUT: 100,000; FIN: 51,952; NZ: 15,000	32	
Michael Jackson	Dangerous	1991	New jack swing, R&B, pop	17.0: US: 8 million; JPN: 400,000; UK: 1.8 million; GER: 2 million; FRA: 1 million; CAN: 600,000; AUS: 700,000; BRA: 100,000; MEX: 600,000; NLD: 300,000; SWE: 300,000; SPA: 600,000; SWI: 250,000; AUT: 200,000; DEN: 60,000; FIN: 61,896; NZ: 90,000; ITA: 60,000	32	
Adele	21	2011	Pop, soul	30.4: US: 17 million; JPN: 100,000; UK: 5.4 million; GER: 1.6 million; CAN: 1.6 million; AUS: 1.19 million; BRA: 480,000; NLD: 200,000; ITA: 480,000; SWE: 120,000; SPA: 300,000; ARG: 80,000; DEN: 180,000; BEL: 180,000; POL: 200,000; SWI: 210,000; MEX: 480,000; NOR: 30,000; AUT: 20,000; RUS: 10,000; FIN: 83,234; HUN: 6,000; IRE: 270,000; NZ: 195,000; POR: 30,000; GRE: 3,000	31	
The Beatles	1	2000	Rock	23.2: US: 11 million; JPN: 2 million; UK: 3.6 million; GER: 1.65 million; FRA: 600,000; CAN: 1 million; AUS: 700,000; BRA: 250,000; NLD: 160,000; ITA: 100,000; SWE: 160,000; SPA: 500,000; ARG: 120,000; BEL: 250,000; SWI: 150,000; NOR: 150,000; AUT: 150,000; DEN: 200,000; POL: 100,000; FIN: 77,466; NZ: 225,000; POR: 120,000	31	
Metallica	Metallica	1991	Heavy metal	27: US: 20 million; JPN: 200,000; UK: 900,000; GER: 2 million; FRA: 300,000; CAN: 1 million; AUS: 910,000; NLD: 200,000; ITA: 50,000; SWE: 100,000; MEX: 75,000; ARG: 300,000; BEL: 100,000; POL: 70,000; NOR: 150,000; DEN: 140,000; SWI: 200,000; AUT: 100,000; FIN: 112,856; NZ: 150,000	31	
Celine Dion	Let's Talk About Love	1997	Pop, soft rock	20.5: US: 11 million; JPN: 1 million; UK: 1.8 million; GER: 1.5 million; FRA: 1 million; CAN: 1 million; AUS: 490,000; NLD: 500,000; SWE: 240,000; SPA: 400,000; DEN: 220,000; ARG: 120,000; BEL: 200,000; POL: 200,000; SWI 300,000; NOR: 200,000; AUT: 100,000; FIN: 97,744; NZ: 135,000; HKG: 40,000; URY: 3,000	31	
Bob Marley and the Wailers	Legend: The Best of Bob Marley & The Wailers	1984	Reggae	25.9: US: 18 million; UK: 4.260 million; GER: 500,000; FRA: 1 million; CAN: 200,000; AUS: 420,000; NLD: 100,000; ITA: 100,000; SWE: 50,000; SPA: 100,000; ARG: 240,000; BEL: 200,000; NOR: 25,000; SWI: 300,000; AUT: 100,000; FIN: 36,703; NZ: 300,000	30	
Nirvana	Nevermind	1991	Grunge, alternative rock	24.8: US: 13 million; JPN: 600,000; UK: 2.7 million; GER: 1 million; FRA: 1 million; CAN: 1 million; AUS: 350,000; BRA: 250,000; NLD: 100,000; ITA: 150,000; SPA: 100,000; SWE: 200,000; DEN: 120,000; MEX: 200,000; ARG: 180,000; BEL: 400,000; POL: 160,000; SWI: 50,000; AUT: 50,000; FIN: 46,830; NZ: 105,000; POR: 40,000	30	
Guns N' Roses	Appetite for Destruction	1987	Hard rock	22.8: US: 18 million; JPN: 200,000; UK: 1,200,000; GER: 500,000; FRA: 200,000; CAN: 1 million; AUS: 490,000; BRA: 350,000; NLD: 100,000; ITA: 100,000; SPA: 50,000; SWE: 80,000; DEN: 80,000; MEX: 100,000; ARG: 180,000; SWI: 50,000; AUT: 100,000; FIN: 25,000; NZ: 75,000	30	
Bruce Springsteen	Born in the U.S.A.	1984	Heartland rock	22: US: 17 million; UK: 900,000; GER: 1 million; FRA: 300,000; CAN: 1 million; AUS: 910,000; ITA: 50,000; SPA: 50,000; DEN: 60,000; MEX: 250,000; BEL: 75,000; SWI: 100,000; FIN: 108,913; NZ: 255,000	30	
ABBA	Gold: Greatest Hits	1992	Pop, disco	21.9: US: 6 million; JPN: 600,000; UK: 6.3 million; GER: 2.5 million; FRA: 1 million; CAN: 1 million; AUS: 1.19 million; BRA: 100,000; NLD: 100,000; ITA: 100,000; SPA: 500,000; SWE: 500,000; SWI: 500,000; MEX: 250,000; ARG: 240,000; BEL: 350,000; AUT: 150,000; DEN: 570,000; POL: 100,000; FIN: 145,962; NZ: 240,000; POR: 20,000; RUS: 10,000	30	
Dire Straits	Brothers in Arms	1985	Roots rock, blues rock, soft rock	21.1: US: 9 million; UK: 4.2 million; GER: 500,000; FRA: 3 million; CAN: 1 million; AUS: 1.19 million; ITA: 550,000; SPA: 300,000; SWE: 50,000; ARG: 30,000; BEL: 200,000; DEN: 120,000; SWI: 300,000; AUT: 200,000; POL: 50,000; FIN: 116,784; NZ: 360,000; HKG: 15,000	30	
Madonna	The Immaculate Collection	1990	Pop, dance	21: US: 11 million; JPN: 800,000; UK: 3.9 million; GER: 750,000; FRA: 1 million; CAN: 700,000; AUS: 980,000; BRA: 500,000; NLD: 300,000; SWE: 50,000; SPA: 300,000; ARG: 360,000; SWI: 50,000; AUT: 50,000; DEN: 80,000; FIN: 92,500; NZ: 105,000	30	
Santana	Supernatural	1999	Latin rock	20.8: US: 15 million; JPN: 200,000; UK: 900,000; GER: 1 million; FRA: 600,000; CAN: 1 million; AUS: 280,000; BRA: 250,000; NLD: 200,000; ITA: 25,000; SWE: 80,000; SPA: 300,000; MEX: 300,000; ARG: 120,000; BEL: 100,000; POL: 100,000; SWI: 200,000; AUT: 100,000; FIN: 50,291; NZ: 60,000	30	
Mariah Carey	Music Box	1993	Pop, R&B	20: US: 10 million; JPN: 2.6 million; UK: 1.5 million; GER: 1.4 million; FRA: 1 million; CAN: 700,000; AUS: 860,000; BRA: 250,000; NLD: 600,000; SWE: 100,000; SPA: 400,000; BEL: 100,000; NOR: 160,000; SWI: 200,000; AUT: 100,000; FIN: 47,382; NZ: 15,000	30	
Pink Floyd	The Wall	1979	Progressive rock	19.2: US: 11.5 million; UK: 900,000; GER: 2 million; FRA: 1 million; CAN: 2 million; AUS: 770,000; NLD: 135,000; ITA: 25,000; SPA: 100,000; DEN: 120,000; ARG: 60,000; POL: 120,000; SWI: 100,000; NZ: 210,000; HKG: 15,000	30	
The Beatles	Sgt. Pepper's Lonely Hearts Club Band	1967	Rock	18.3: US: 11 million; UK: 5.1 million; GER: 500,000; FRA: 100,000; CAN: 800,000; AUS: 280,000; BRA: 100,000; ITA: 50,000; ARG: 300,000; NZ: 90,000	30	
The Beatles	Abbey Road	1969	Rock	16.9: US: 12 million; UK: 2.4 million; GER: 500,000; FRA: 100,000; CAN: 1 million; AUS: 210,000; ITA: 50,000; DEN: 60,000; ARG: 500,000; BEL: 50,000; NZ: 75,000	30	

== 20–29 million copies ==
*All sales figures are shown in millions

Artist	Album	Released	Genre	Total certified copies (from available markets)*	Claimed sales*	Ref.
Various artists	Grease: The Original Soundtrack from the Motion Picture	1978	Rock and roll	20: US: 13 million; UK: 2.7 million; GER: 1.25 million; FRA: 400,000; CAN: 1 million; AUS: 980,000; ITA: 50,000; SPA: 300,000; DEN: 140,000; BEL: 25,000; NOR: 50,000; SWI: 25,000; NZ: 90,000; HKG: 20,000	28	
Norah Jones	Come Away with Me	2002	Acoustic pop	19.9: US: 12 million; JPN: 500,000; UK: 2.4 million; GER: 750,000; FRA: 1 million; CAN: 1 million; AUS: 770,000; BRA: 125,000; NLD: 160,000; ITA: 25,000; SWE: 60,000; SPA: 100,000; DEN: 220,000; ARG: 80,000; BEL: 100,000; SWI: 120,000; AUT: 80,000; POL: 200,000; NZ: 165,000; POR: 80,000	28	
Eminem	The Eminem Show	2002	Hip hop	19.1: US: 12 million; JPN: 600,000; UK: 1.8 million; GER: 900,000; FRA: 600,000; CAN: 1 million; AUS: 1.07 million; BRA: 50,000; NLD: 80,000; ITA: 50,000; SWE: 120,000; SPA: 100,000; DEN: 140,000; MEX: 75,000; ARG: 40,000; BEL: 50,000; NOR: 50,000; SWI: 120,000; AUT: 60,000; POL: 50,000; FIN: 62,212; NZ: 135,000; POR: 40,000	27	
James Horner	Titanic: Music from the Motion Picture	1997	Film score	18.1: US: 11 million; JPN: 1 million; UK: 900,000; GER: 1.25 million; FRA: 1 million; CAN: 1 million; AUS: 350,000; NLD: 175,000; SWE: 160,000; SPA: 400,000; ARG: 60,000; BEL: 150,000; POL: 140,000; SWI: 200,000; AUT: 100,000; NOR: 100,000; FIN: 73,509; NZ: 60,000; HKG: 20,000	27	
Eric Clapton	Unplugged	1992	Acoustic rock, acoustic blues	17: US: 10 million; JPN: 800,000; UK: 1.2 million; GER: 1.250 million; FRA: 600,000; CAN: 1 million; AUS: 560,000; BRA: 250,000; NLD: 400,000; ITA: 25,000; SWE: 100,000; SPA: 300,000; DEN: 60,000; ARG: 120,000; BEL: 100,000; SWI: 100,000; AUT: 100,000; POL: 50,000; FIN: 45,034; NZ: 15,000	26	
Queen	Greatest Hits	1981	Rock	20.6: US: 9 million; JPN: 100,000; UK: 6.9 million; GER: 1.750 million; FRA: 200,000; CAN: 300,000; AUS: 1.05 million; BRA: 250,000; NLD: 100,000; ITA: 50,000; SWE: 50,000; SPA: 50,000; ARG: 180,000; SWI: 250,000; AUT: 200,000; POL: 50,000; FIN: 55,058; NZ: 150,000	25	
Britney Spears	...Baby One More Time	1999	Pop, dance-pop, teen pop	20.1: US: 14 million; JPN: 200,000; UK: 1.2 million; GER: 750,000; FRA: 600,000; CAN: 1 million; AUS: 280,000; BRA: 100,000; NLD: 300,000; SWE: 80,000; SPA: 300,000; DEN: 60,000; MEX: 375,000; ARG: 240,000; BEL: 150,000; NOR: 50,000; SWI: 100,000; AUT: 50,000; POL: 100,000; NZ: 45,000	25	
Bon Jovi	Slippery When Wet	1986	Hard rock, glam metal	18.3: US: 15 million; UK: 900,000; GER: 500,000; CAN: 1 million; AUS: 420,000; SPA: 100,000; NOR: 50,000; DEN: 10,000; SWI: 250,000; FIN: 73,564; NZ: 15,000	25	
Journey	Greatest Hits	1988	Rock, hard rock, pop rock	18.3: US: 18 million; UK: 300,000; CAN: 50,000; IRE: 15,000	25	
Whitney Houston	Whitney Houston	1985	Pop, R&B	17.7: US: 14 million; UK: 1.2 million; GER: 500,000; FRA: 100,000; CAN: 1 million; AUS: 280,000; NLD: 100,000; SWE: 200,000; NOR: 100,000; BEL: 25,000; SWI: 50,000; AUT: 50,000; FIN: 29,109; HKG: 15,000; NZ: 15,000	25	
Phil Collins	No Jacket Required	1985	Pop rock	17.7: US: 12 million; UK: 1.8 million; GER: 1.5 million; FRA: 600,000; CAN: 1 million; AUS: 70,000; NLD: 100,000; ITA: 250,000; SPA: 100,000; ARG: 180,000; SWI: 100,000; AUT: 50,000; FIN: 34,203; NZ: 15,000	25	
Eminem	The Marshall Mathers LP	2000	Hip hop	17.5: US: 11 million; JPN: 200,000; UK: 2.4 million; GER: 900,000; FRA: 600,000; CAN: 800,000; AUS: 280,000; BRA: 100,000; NLD: 80,000; ITA: 25,000; SWE: 160,000; SPA: 100,000; DEN: 100,000; MEX: 150,000; ARG: 30,000; BEL: 100,000; NOR: 100,000; SWI: 200,000; AUT: 50,000; POL: 100,000; FIN: 40,055; NZ: 75,000	25	
Linkin Park	Hybrid Theory	2000	Nu metal, rap metal, alternative metal	17.2: US: 12 million; JPN: 200,000; UK: 1.8 million; GER: 900,000; FRA: 200,000; CAN: 500,000; AUS: 350,000; BRA: 250,000; NLD: 80,000; ITA: 100,000; SWE: 80,000; SPA: 100,000; DEN: 80,000; MEX: 150,000; ARG: 60,000; BEL: 100,000; SWI: 50,000; AUT: 50,000; POL: 100,000; FIN: 62,629; NZ: 75,000	25	
U2	The Joshua Tree	1987	Rock	16.7: US: 10 million; UK: 2.7 million; GER: 1 million; FRA: 600,000; CAN: 1 million; AUS: 350,000; NLD: 100,000; ITA: 25,000; SPA: 400,000; MEX: 100,000; ARG: 60,000; SWI: 50,000; AUT: 150,000; FIN: 27,965; NZ: 210,000	25	
Prince and the Revolution	Purple Rain	1984	Pop, Pop rock, R&B	15.7: US: 13 million; UK: 600,000; GER: 750,000; FRA: 300,000; CAN: 600,000; AUS: 210,000; NLD: 100,000; ITA: 25,000; SPA: 50,000; DEN: 10,000; SWI: 50,000; AUT: 25,000; NZ: 75,000	25	
Carole King	Tapestry	1971	Soft rock, pop	15.1: US: 14 million; UK: 600,000; AUS: 560,000; NZ: 15,000	25	
Madonna	True Blue	1986	Pop, dance	14.5: US: 7 million; JPN: 100,000; UK: 2.1 million; GER: 1 million; FRA: 1 million; CAN: 1 million; AUS: 280,000; BRA: 100,000; NLD: 100,000; ITA: 800,000; SPA: 300,000; ARG: 240,000; BEL: 75,000; NOR: 100,000; SWI: 150,000; AUT: 50,000; FIN: 53,912; NZ: 75,000; POR: 20,000	25	
George Michael	Faith	1987	Pop, R&B, funk, soul	13.9: US: 10 million; UK: 1.2 million; GER: 250,000; FRA: 600,000; CAN: 1 million; AUS: 350,000; NLD: 100,000; SWE: 50,000; SPA: 200,000; DEN: 20,000; ARG: 60,000; NOR: 50,000; SWI: 100,000; NZ: 15,000	25	
Simon & Garfunkel	Bridge over Troubled Water	1970	Folk rock	12.5: US: 8 million; UK: 3.3 million; GER: 500,000; FRA: 300,000; CAN: 400,000; SWI: 25,000; FIN: 25,000	25	
Elton John	Greatest Hits	1974	Pop	19.1: US: 17 million; JPN: 200,000; UK: 800,000; FRA: 100,000; CAN: 1 million	24	
Backstreet Boys	Millennium	1999	Pop	18.4: US: 13 million; JPN: 800,000; UK: 300,000; GER: 750,000; CAN: 1 million; AUS: 210,000; BRA: 500,000; NLD: 200,000; SWE: 80,000; SPA: 400,000; MEX: 675,000; ARG: 180,000; BEL: 100,000; NOR: 50,000; SWI: 50,000; AUT: 25,000; POL: 50,000; FIN: 42,525; NZ: 30,000	24	
Adele	25	2015	Soul, pop, R&B	20: US: 12 million; UK: 3.6 million; GER: 1.2 million; CAN: 800,000; AUS: 700,000; BRA: 160,000; ITA: 250,000; SWE: 80,000; SPA: 120,000; DEN: 100,000; BEL: 240,000; MEX: 210,000; NOR: 80,000; SWI: 120,000; AUT: 60,000; POL: 100,000; FIN: 47,482; NZ: 180,000; POR: 15,000	23	
Spice Girls	Spice	1996	Pop, dance-pop, R&B	16.4: US: 7 million; JPN: 400,000; UK: 3 million; GER: 750,000; FRA: 1 million; CAN: 1 million; AUS: 420,000; BRA: 500,000; NLD: 300,000; SWE: 160,000; SPA: 1 million; DEN: 120,000; MEX: 100,000; BEL: 150,000; NOR: 100,000; SWI: 100,000; AUT: 50,000; POL: 200,000; FIN: 76,375; NZ: 15,000	23	
Ace of Base	Happy Nation/The Sign	1993	Dance-pop, reggae pop	14.4: US: 9 million; JPN: 600,000; UK: 600,000; GER: 1.5 million; FRA: 1 million; CAN: 1 million; AUS: 70,000; BRA: 100,000; NLD: 200,000; SPA: 100,000; SWI: 100,000; AUT: 75,000; FIN: 82,715; NZ: 15,000	23	
Green Day	American Idiot	2004	Punk rock	11.6: US: 6 million; JPN: 500,000; UK: 2 million; GER: 800,000; FRA: 300,000; CAN: 1 million; AUS: 420,000; BRA: 93,627; NLD: 40,000; SWE: 60,000; SPA: 50,000; MEX: 100,000; BEL: 50,000; SWI: 80,000; AUT: 60,000; FIN: 23,133; NZ: 60,000	23	
Michael Jackson	HIStory: Past, Present and Future, Book I	1995	R&B, pop, hip hop	15.5: US: 8 million; JPN: 400,000; UK: 1.2 million; GER: 1.5 million; FRA: 1 million; CAN: 500,000; AUS: 560,000; BRA: 100,000; NLD: 300,000; ITA: 50,000; SWE: 100,000; SPA: 300,000; ARG: 60,000; DEN: 250,000; MEX: 350,000; BEL: 250,000; NOR: 50,000; SWI: 150,000; AUT: 100,000; POL: 100,000; FIN: 61,352; NZ: 135,000	22	
Celine Dion	All the Way... A Decade of Song	1999	Pop	14.4: US: 7 million; JPN: 2 million; UK: 1.2 million; GER: 1.050 million; FRA: 600,000; CAN: 1 million; AUS: 350,000; BRA: 250,000; SWE: 160,000; SPA: 200,000; ARG: 60,000; BEL: 150,000; NOR: 100,000; SWI: 150,000; AUT: 50,000; POL: 100,000; FIN: 55,713; NZ: 60,000	22	
Oasis	(What's the Story) Morning Glory?	1995	Britpop, rock	11.6: US: 4 million; JPN: 200,000; UK: 4.8 million; GER: 250,000; FRA: 300,000; CAN: 800,000; AUS: 560,000; NLD: 50,000; ITA: 100,000; SWE: 100,000; SPA: 200,000; DEN: 120,000; ARG: 30,000; BEL: 25,000; NOR: 50,000; SWI: 25,000; AUT: 25,000; FIN: 27,540; NZ: 15,000	22	
Fugees	The Score	1996	Hip hop	11.5: US: 7 million; JPN: 100,000; UK: 1.5 million; GER: 750,000; FRA: 1 million; CAN: 500,000; AUS: 70,000; ITA: 25,000; DEN: 80,000; SWE: 100,000; SPA: 100,000; BEL: 50,000; NOR: 25,000; SWI: 100,000; AUT: 50,000; POL: 100,000; FIN: 26,267; NZ: 15,000	22	
Madonna	Like a Virgin	1984	Pop, dance	16.2: US: 10 million; JPN: 100,000; UK: 900,000; GER: 750,000; FRA: 600,000; CAN: 1 million; AUS: 490,000; ITA: 1 million; SPA: 100,000; BEL: 75,000; SWI: 100,000; FIN: 35,398; NZ: 75,000	21	
Bon Jovi	Cross Road	1994	Hard rock, glam metal	15: US: 7 million; JPN: 1 million; UK: 1.8 million; GER: 1 million; FRA: 300,000; CAN: 1 million; AUS: 910,000; ITA: 500,000; NLD: 200,000; SWE: 100,000; SPA: 400,000; ARG: 240,000; BEL: 100,000; SWI: 150,000; AUT: 150,000; POL: 50,000; FIN: 123,354; NZ: 105,000	21	
Green Day	Dookie	1994	Pop-punk, punk rock, alternative rock	24.6: US: 20 million; JPN: 200,000; UK: 900,000; GER: 750,000; FRA: 100,000; CAN: 1 million; AUS: 350,000; BRA: 100,000; ITA: 50,000; SWE: 50,000; SPA: 100,000; ARG: 60,000; BEL: 25,000; DEN: 80,000; SWI: 25,000; AUT: 50,000; POL: 50,000; FIN: 35,205; NZ: 15,000; IRE: 60,000	20	
Hootie & the Blowfish	Cracked Rear View	1994	Roots rock, heartland rock	23.2: US: 22 million; UK: 100,000; CAN: 1 million; AUS: 140,000	20	
Elvis Presley	Elvis' Christmas Album	1957	Christmas, pop, gospel, rock and roll	20.8: US: 20 million; UK: 440,000; CAN: 400,000; AUS: 35,000	20	
Boston	Boston	1976	Arena rock, hard rock	18.1: US: 17 million; UK: 100,000; CAN: 1 million	20	
Mariah Carey	Daydream	1995	Pop, R&B	15.2: US: 11 million; JPN: 1 million; UK: 600,000; GER: 500,000; FRA: 600,000; CAN: 700,000; AUS: 350,000; NLD: 100,000; SPA: 200,000; BEL: 50,000; NOR: 50,000; SWI: 25,000; AUT: 25,000; POL: 50,000; NZ: 15,000	20	
Whitney Houston	Whitney	1987	Pop, R&B	14.5: US: 10 million; UK: 2.1 million; GER: 500,000; FRA: 300,000; CAN: 700,000; NLD: 100,000; SWE: 200,000; SPA: 200,000; NOR: 100,000; DEN: 20,000; SWI: 100,000; AUT: 100,000; FIN: 59,053; HKG: 15,000; NZ: 15,000	20	
Shania Twain	The Woman in Me	1995	Country, pop	14.5: US: 12 million; UK: 300,000; CAN: 2 million; AUS: 210,000	20	
Britney Spears	Oops!... I Did It Again	2000	Pop, dance-pop	14.4: US: 10 million; JPN: 200,000; UK: 900,000; GER: 900,000; FRA: 300,000; CAN: 500,000; AUS: 210,000; BRA: 100,000; NLD: 160,000; SWE: 80,000; SPA: 200,000; MEX: 300,000; ARG: 60,000; BEL: 150,000; NOR: 50,000; SWI: 100,000; AUT: 100,000; POL: 100,000; FIN: 54,274; NZ: 30,000	20	
Def Leppard	Hysteria	1987	Hard rock, glam metal	13.9: US: 12 million; UK: 600,000; CAN: 1 million; AUS: 280,000; SWE: 50,000; NOR: 50,000; SWI: 50,000; NZ: 15,000	20	
Lauryn Hill	The Miseducation of Lauryn Hill	1998	Neo Soul, R&B, Hip-hop	13.7: US: 10 million; JPN: 1 million; UK: 1.2 million; FRA: 300,000; CAN: 700,000; AUS: 140,000; NLD: 100,000; SWE: 80,000; SPA: 50,000; BEL: 50,000; NOR: 50,000; SWI: 50,000; AUT: 25,000; NZ: 45,000	20	
Tracy Chapman	Tracy Chapman	1988	Folk rock	13.3: US: 6 million; UK: 2.1 million; GER: 2.250 million; FRA: 1 million; CAN: 300,000; AUS: 490,000; BRA: 100,000; NLD: 100,000; ITA: 25,000; SWE: 50,000; SPA: 300,000; ARG: 120,000; DEN: 120,000; SWI: 200,000; AUT: 100,000; NZ: 15,000; POR: 40,000	20	
Michael Jackson	Off the Wall	1979	Disco, pop, funk, R&B	12.8: US: 10 million; UK: 1.8 million; FRA: 300,000; CAN: 100,000; AUS: 350,000; NLD: 100,000; ITA: 50,000; DEN: 20,000; NZ: 90,000	20	
Lionel Richie	Can't Slow Down	1983	Pop, R&B, soul	12.3: US: 10 million; UK: 900,000; GER: 250,000; FRA: 100,000; CAN: 1 million; NLD: 100,000; SPA: 50,000; FIN: 50,608; NZ: 15,000	20	
Celine Dion	The Colour of My Love	1993	Pop	11.1: US: 6 million; JPN: 600,000; UK: 1.5 million; GER: 250,000; FRA: 300,000; CAN: 1 million; AUS: 630,000; NLD: 300,000; SWE: 100,000; SPA: 100,000; BEL: 100,000; NOR: 150,000; SWI: 50,000; AUT: 25,000; FIN: 40,289; NZ: 15,000	20	
Pink Floyd	Wish You Were Here	1975	Progressive rock	10.9: US: 6 million; GER: 1.5 million; FRA: 1 million; UK: 600,000; AUS: 490,000; ITA: 450,000; SPA: 325,000; CAN: 300,000; AUT: 100,000; BRA: 80,000; ARG: 30,000; POL: 20,000	20	
Amy Winehouse	Back to Black	2006	R&B, soul, jazz	10.8: US: 2 million; JPN: 100,000; UK: 4.5 million; GER: 1.2 million; FRA: 400,000; CAN: 100,000; AUS: 420,000; BRA: 250,000; ITA: 250,000; SPA: 560,000; BEL: 150,000; POL: 40,000; DEN: 180,000; AUT: 210,000; NOR: 40,000; SWI: 210,000; FIN: 33,884; RUS: 40,000; NZ: 105,000; HUN: 6,000; GRE: 15,000; TUR: 5,000	20	
Andrea Bocelli	Romanza	1997	Operatic pop	10.1: US: 3 million; UK: 300,000; GER: 1 million; FRA: 1.3 million; CAN: 1.3 million; AUS: 490,000; BRA: 900,000; ITA: 30,000; SWE: 80,000; SPA: 500,000; ARG: 500,000; BEL: 100,000; SWI: 350,000; NOR: 150,000; AUT: 50,000; FIN: 28,592; NZ: 45,000	20	

== Timeline of the best-selling albums ==
Timeline of the highest-selling album record
Year record set	Artist	Album	Record-setting sales (millions)	Total sales (millions)	Ref.
1945	Various Artists	Oklahoma! (original Broadway cast)	0.5	1.0	
After 1946	Al Jolson	The Jolson Story	1		
1956	Various Artists	Oklahoma! (movie soundtrack)	1.75	2.5	
1956/1957	Various Artists	My Fair Lady	2	5	
1960	Various Artists	South Pacific	2.25	3	
1963	Vaughn Meader	The First Family	4	7.5	
1968	Various Artists	The Sound of Music	8^{WW}		
1969	Iron Butterfly	In-A-Gadda-Da-Vida	8^{WW}	30	
1973	Carole King	Tapestry	10+		
1975/1976	Various Artists	The Sound of Music	10–15^{SM-T}		
1976	Carole King	Tapestry	13.5^{SM-T}	25	
1979	Bee Gees/Various Artists	Saturday Night Fever	25–27	40	
1984	Michael Jackson	Thriller	35	70	

Notes

- ^{WW}It is unclear whether this sales figure refers to worldwide sales or US sales.
- ^{SM-T}The exact year in which Tapestry regained the title of "best-selling album of all time", if it ever regained it at all, is unclear. The album's 1976 sales claim is therefore only listed to be inclusive, as it is plausible that Tapestry had overtaken The Sound of Music in sales during this time period.

== Best-selling album by year worldwide ==
The charts of the best-selling albums by year in the world are compiled by the International Federation of the Phonographic Industry annually since 2001. These charts are published in their two annual reports, the Digital Music Report and the Recording Industry in Numbers. Both the Digital Music Report and the Recording Industry in Numbers were replaced in 2016 by the Global Music Report.

In 2022, for sales of albums in 2021, IFPI reported three formats of sales chart, the Global all-format chart which includes all physical sales, digital downloads and streaming numbers, newly created Global vinyl album chart counting vinyl physical sales, combination of physical sales and digital downloads as Global album sales chart.

Year	Album	Artist(s)	Sales (millions)	Ref.
2001	Hybrid Theory	Linkin Park	9.0	
2002	The Eminem Show	Eminem	13.9	
2003	Come Away with Me	Norah Jones	11.0	
2004	Confessions	Usher	12.0	
2005	X&Y	Coldplay	8.3	
2006	High School Musical	Various Artists	7.0	
2007	High School Musical 2	Various Artists	6.0	
2008	Viva la Vida or Death and All His Friends	Coldplay	6.8	
2009	I Dreamed a Dream	Susan Boyle	8.3	
2010	Recovery	Eminem	5.7	
2011	21	Adele	18.1	
2012	21	Adele	8.3	
2013	Midnight Memories	One Direction	4.0	
2014	Frozen	Various Artists	10.0	
2015	25	Adele	17.4	
2016	Lemonade	Beyoncé	2.5	
2017	÷	Ed Sheeran	6.1	
2018	The Greatest Showman	Hugh Jackman & Various Artists	3.5	
2019	5x20 All the Best!! 1999–2019	Arashi	3.3	
2020	Map of the Soul: 7	BTS	4.8	
2021	30	Adele	4.7	
2022	Greatest Works of Art	Jay Chou	7.2	
2023	FML	Seventeen	6.4	
2024	The Tortured Poets Department	Taylor Swift	5.6	
2025	The Life of a Showgirl	Taylor Swift	6.05	

== See also ==
- Album era
- Lists of albums
- List of fastest-selling albums
- List of best-selling albums by women
- List of best-selling albums by country
- List of best-selling Latin albums
- List of best-selling remix albums
- List of best-selling music artists
- List of best-selling albums of the 21st century
- List of best-selling singles
- List of best-selling singles by country
