= Comparison of recording media =

This article details a comparison of audio recording media.

== Comparison ==
Format	Type	Image	Typical length
Phonograph cylinders	Analog		3 minutes
78 rpm record	Analog		Around 3–5 minutes per side
45 rpm record	Analog		Often around 4 minutes (EP: 7 minutes) per side, up to 6 per side, in some cases even a few minutes longer.
LP record	Analog		Typically 15–25 minutes per side (30 minutes per side for classical & spoken word), although 45 minutes is possible with tight groove spacing and no spacing between tracks.
Audio cassette	Analog		Usually 30 (C-60) or 45 (C-90) minutes per side, 60 (C-120) minutes per side have also been sold although the tape is more prone to stretching or breaking.
8-Track	Analog		Up to 100 minutes, often 45 to 80
Reel-to-Reel	Analog		1.5 hours (both sides) if recorded at 7.5 inches per second (ips) on a standard 1800 ft reel. Professionals record at 30 ips on 3600 ft reels that will fit 22.5 minutes (one side only). A 3600 ft reel can hold up to 48 hours if recorded in mono (4 sides) at 15/16 ips.
Compact disc	Digital		Earlier discs: up to 74 minutes (or up to 650 MB of data files)
Compact disc	Digital		Later discs: up to 80 minutes (or up to 700 MB of data files)
Recordable discs	Digital		Up to 99 minutes, though unlikely to be reliable after 90 minutes due to mistracking
MiniDisc	Digital		Earlier discs: 74 minutes up to 296 minutes, dependent upon compression used.
MiniDisc	Digital		Later discs: 80 minutes up to 320 minutes, dependent upon compression used.
Hi-MD	Digital		Up to 13 hours on a standard 80-minute MiniDisc.
Hi-MD	Digital		Up to 45 hours on a 1 GB Hi-MD (MiniDisc)
Digital audio player	Digital		Roughly 186 hours of playback per 10 GiB, assuming an average bitrate of 128 kbit/s. Roughly 372 hours with 64 kbit/s and roughly 74 hours with 320 kbit/s.
DVD	Digital		Around 8.5 hours per layer (4.7 GB), with a maximum of two layers per side, which roughly equals 35 hours on a dual layered, two sided disc (can change due to compression).
SACD	Digital		Hybrid: A "Red Book" layer compatible with most legacy Compact Disc players, dubbed the "CD layer," and a 4.7 GB SACD layer, dubbed the "HD layer."
SACD	Digital		Single-layer: Physically a DVD-5 DVD, a single-layer SACD includes a 4.7 GB HD layer with no CD layer.
SACD	Digital		Dual-layer: Physically a DVD-9 DVD, a dual-layer SACD includes two HD layers totalling 8.5 GB, with no CD layer.
HD DVD	Digital		Single-layer: 15 GB
HD DVD	Digital		Dual-layer capacity: 30 GB
Blu-ray	Digital		50 GB (23 hours)
VHS/S-VHS-tape	Analog		240 minutes for PAL/SECAM, 180 minutes for NTSC
VHS-C/S-VHS-C-tape	Analog		45 minutes for PAL/SECAM, 40 minutes for NTSC
DAT-tape	Digital		120 minutes
DCC-tape	Digital		105 minutes

The typical duration of a vinyl album is about 15 to 25 minutes per side. Classical music and spoken word recordings can extend to over 30 minutes on a side. If a side exceeds the average time, the maximum groove amplitude is reduced to make room for the additional program material. This can cause hiss in the sound when the volume is turned up to compensate for the lower recorded level. An extreme example, Todd Rundgren's Initiation LP, with 36 minutes of music on one side, has a "technical note" at the bottom of the inner sleeve: "if the sound does not seem loud enough on your system, try re-recording the music onto tape." The total of around 40–45 minutes often influences the arrangement of tracks, with the preferred positions being the opening tracks of each side.

Although the term EP is commonly used to describe a 7" single with more than two tracks, technically they are not different from a normal 7" single. The EP uses reduced dynamic range and a smaller run-off groove area to extend the playing time. However, there are examples of singles, such as The Beatles' "Hey Jude" or Queen's "Bohemian Rhapsody", which are six minutes long or more. (In 1989, RCA released 'Dreamtime' by the band Love and Rockets, which clocks at 8:40). These longer recordings would require the same technical approach as an EP. The term EP has also been used for 10" 45 rpm records, typically containing a reduced number of tracks.

Vinyl albums have a large 12" (30 cm) album cover, which also allows cover designers scope for imaginative designs, often including fold-outs and leaflets.

== See also ==
- Audio format
- Audio storage
- CardTalk
- Comparison of analog and digital recording
- DJ
- Hard drive
- Magnetic cartridge
- RCA Corporation
- Record changer
- Record press
- Sound recording
- Unusual types of gramophone records
- Voyager Golden Record
- Vinyl Emulation Software
