= Joy Ridderhof =

American Missionary to the Unreached

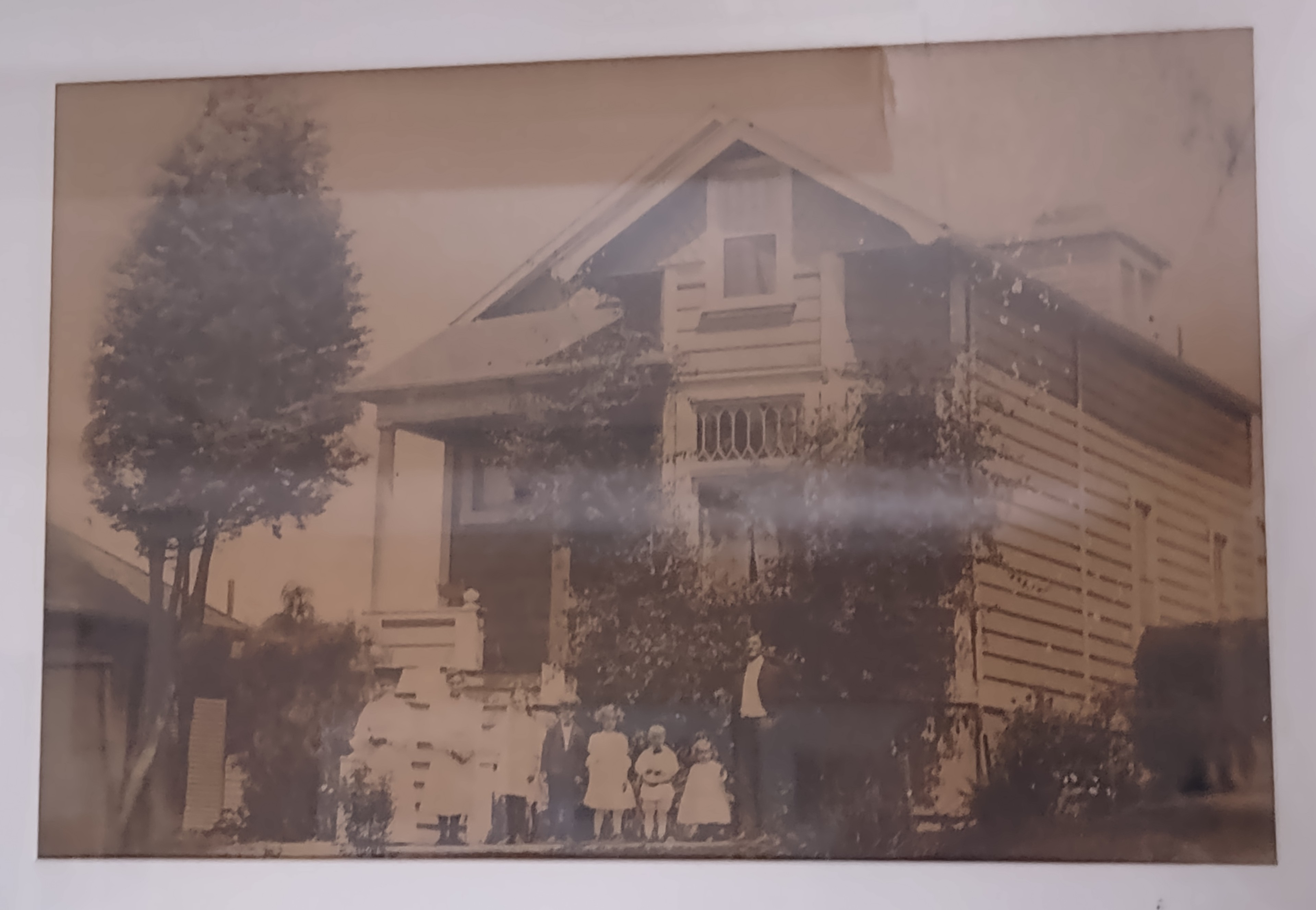
Joy Ridderhof (far right) / GRN USA Archival Files

Joy F. Ridderhof (March 30, 1903 in Minnesota - December 19, 1984 in Stanton, California) was an American missionary.

The youngest child of Dutch and Swedish immigrants, Joy Ridderhof was one of the first graduates of Columbia International University (Columbia Bible School) in 1923. In 1930, she traveled to Honduras, establishing her ministry in Marcala and neighboring villages. Forced to return to the United States to recover from malaria, she began making Spanish evangelizing recordings that she distributed to places in Latin America, including Marcala. She was then asked to produce some Navajo recordings that Navajo speakers would provide. She accepted, and then she got more jobs. This led her to form Gospel Recordings, Inc. in 1939.

Gospel Recordings (renamed Global Recordings Network) delivers the Gospel to oral-preference people in Africa, South America, Asia, Australia, and Central America via hand-operated record players. As of 2026 the organization has produced recordings in over 6,700 languages.

Ridderhof and Gospel Recordings are the subjects of the 2006 P.O.V. documentary The Tailenders.

While Joy Ridderhof was attending Columbia Bible School, she learned two life changing truths that stayed with her for the rest of her life: one is "to worry is a sin" and the other is "rejoicing is always God's will no matter what." She started making audio gospel recordings when such recordings were considered to be revolutionary. When she was a missionary to Honduras, she found that many could not read. That prompted her to make gramophone recordings of the gospel verses and songs in Spanish, and the first product was made to send to Honduras in 1939. Joy Ridderhof and her missionary colleague went to the Philippines in 1950s, and thanks to a Gospel Recordings engineer, she was able to bring a portable battery operated tape recorder to the very remote areas of the Philippines. Joy Ridderhof met Stewart Mill in Australia in 1952 on her way to Papua New Guinea (PNG) and she convinced him to start the Global Recordings Network (GRN) office in Australia. It was there that the first hand-cranked record player was developed.

Dr. George Cowan, who had a passion to pray for the Bibleless peoples and was the president of Wycliffe Bible Translators International from 1956 to 1981, once said, "It was Joy [Ridderhof], specifically Joy who coming back from her trip to the Philippines, challenged us--the Wycliffe Bible Translators--to go to the Pacific part of the world.... She was a very true instrument of God to pass the vision on...." Joy Ridderhof went as a missionary to Honduras, Mexico, Alaska, the Philippines, and Africa. She and her helpers faced lack of money, wartime restrictions, equipment needs, mechanical breakdowns, travel hardships, and uncertainties. Through it all, answers to prayer multiplied. The organization she created, Gospel Recordings, Inc., continues to record the Good News for those with no written language. After Joy Ridderhof died on December 19, 1984, Global Recordings Network continues to grow into global-scale to reach out to over 6,700 languages and dialects (speech varieties) today.

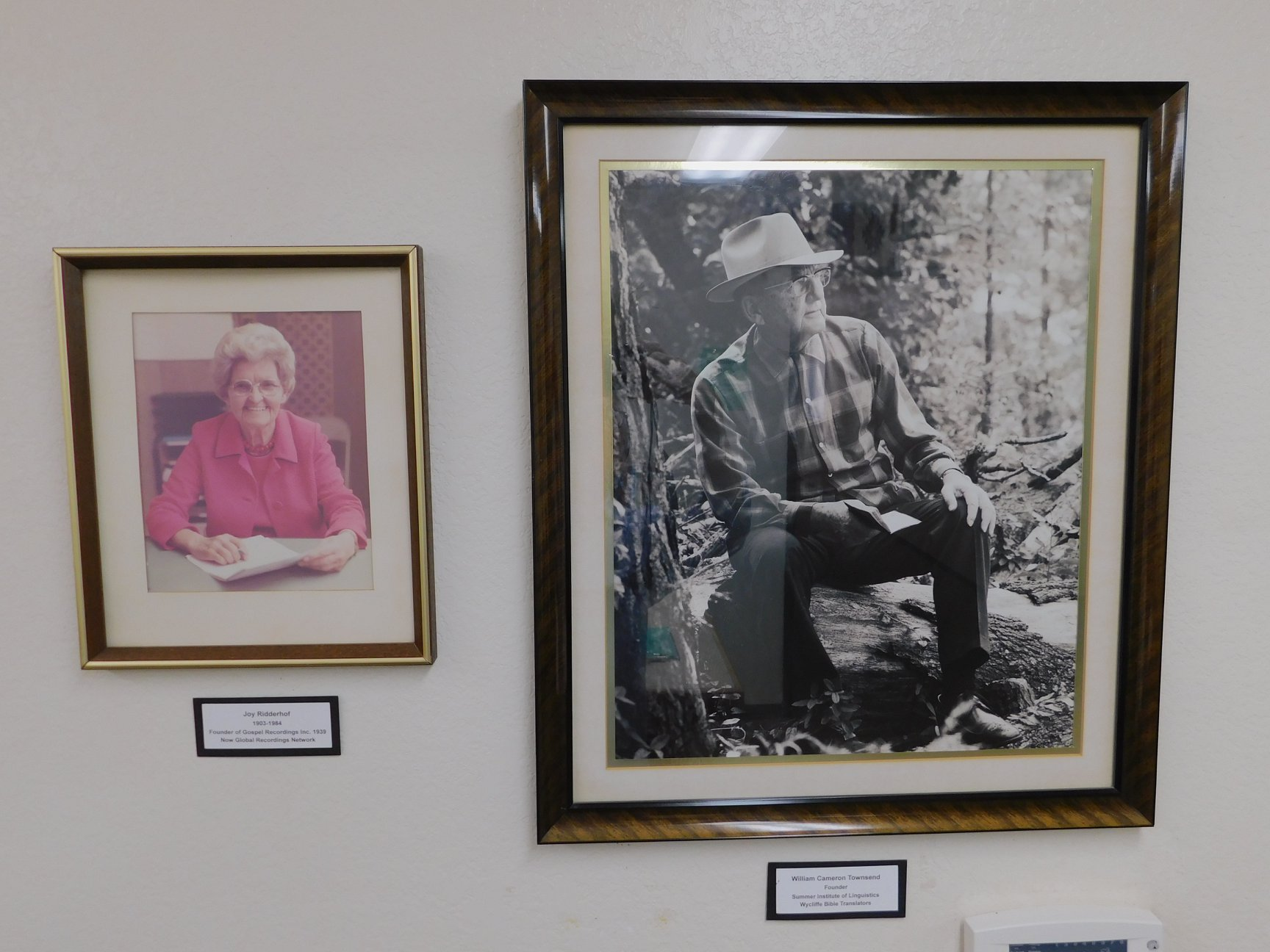
GRN Founder Joy Ridderhof and WBT-SIL Founder Uncle Cam / GRN USA files

Influence in early life

Joy started attending the Columbia Bible School in 1923 (Columbia International University today, established 1923) and she was one of the first students attending the school without any dormitories built yet. Obviously she was also one of the first graduates of the school. She lived with the first president Dr. Robert C. McQuilkin's family so that she was able to attend the first class. In Dr. McQuilkin's home, she encountered and found the life changing principle of "worry was sin; rejoice in all circumstances which was God's will." Dr. Robert C. McQuilkin was a popular author as well as a conference speaker and he introduced her to the concept of "worry was sin" that stayed in her heart for the rest of her life.

Idea of recordings

When Joy was in Honduras as a missionary, she realized that many among the people she encountered could not read. Joy and her fellow missionary were passing by a saloon and overheard some Spanish song played by the gramophone inside the saloon. Her fellow missionary said, “if only we had gospel recordings in Spanish to play for these people.” Joy had already had a memory of her childhood when her father bought a used gramophone for her family and she listened to the gramophone records whose songs were still remembered long after she grew up.

Early Recordings

Joy and some of her friends created a Spanish program of scripture and songs. They recorded this “Buenas Nuevas” (Good News) at a small recording studio run by a friend in 1938. It was a three-and-a-half minute recording in Spanish. She mailed the first gramophone records to a missionary in Honduras in 1939. Soon after, Joy received an encouraging letter requesting more records. People were able to listen to these recordings over and over again. Even though the first record was in Spanish by a speaker with an American accent, it was successful. She soon found that recordings by the indigenous speakers were more effective. She established her ministry in the town of Marcala, Honduras and multiplied her missions through other parts of Spanish speaking countries. Later, requests came from different areas which needed such records in different languages and not just Spanish.

The home office

Joy started the office in her upstairs attic bedroom in Los Angeles, California in 1937 and it also became a studio soon after. That home office, named Spanish Gospel Recordings, was once located at 122 Witmer Street, Los Angeles. Her home office was relocated a few times in Los Angeles, California. She wanted to go to the mission fields herself to make the recordings to have them recorded by the native speakers rather than the native speakers come to Los Angeles, and that was a case afterwards as her missions expanded. In 1939 she formed the nonprofit organization called Gospel Recordings, Inc. in Los Angeles, California and later renamed as Global Recordings Network in consideration of the global need of the recordings. The home office as the USA mobilization center moved to the newly constructed building in Temecula, California in 2004 and then moved again at present location Catalina (Tucson), Arizona in 2020.

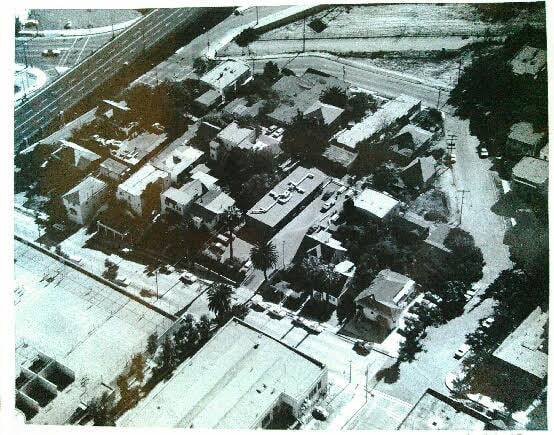
Joy Ridderhof's Housing Unit in Los Angeles, California (picture courtesy of Los Angeles County)

Hardships

As a young missionary with Friends Mission Board to Honduras from 1930 to 1936, Joy struggled with the typical tropical diseases. Bouts of dysentery and malaria challenged her return to Honduras after her time on home leave, but she did return to Honduras in 1937 lacking financial support and experiencing equipment breakdowns, material needs, and travel difficulties.

Missionary countries in early stage

Joy's first call was as a missionary to Honduras. Wycliffe missionaries requested her to make recordings for the Navajo Indians in Arizona in 1940. She went to help out Mazahua Indians in Mexico. She went and recorded for Eskimos in Alaska. She went to the Philippines where she was able to bring for the first time a portable battery operated tape recorder to the remote area developed by a Gospel Recordings engineer. She went to Congo and other parts of Africa. She met Stewart Mill in Australia on her way to Papua New Guinea (PNG). That resulted in opening the second Global Recordings Network office in Australia.

Global missions

Joy's recording mission has been expanded from the Central America to all over in Latin America and eventually the whole world. Joy died in 1984, and the work of Global Recordings Network is growing in the number of recordings, requests for recordings, new equipment, digital devices (CDs, MP3, SD Cards, Bible boxes, etc.).

Today over 6,700 languages and speech varieties (dialects) are available of an estimated 14,000 languages and speech varieties (dialects) existing globally. Those numbers are increasing as more dialects (speech varieties) are being discovered. Global Recordings Network produces audio and audiovisual products such as "the Gospel," "Bible stories," "simple Bible teaching," "music & songs," "testimony," "poetry and proverbs," "drama," and "dialogue and questions and answers" recorded by using mother tongue native speakers. For many, storytelling is the most effective style of communication. Global Recordings Network recruits and equips recordists along with researchers from many parts of the world. The Global Recordings Network offices (consisting of centers, bases, and representatives) are in over 50 countries around the world. Global Recordings Network has a partnership with Joshua Project, Jesus Film Harvest Partners, The HOPE Project, OMF, Missionary Aviation, Operation Mobilization (OM), Digital Bible Society, Mega Voice International, Renew World Outreach, SIM, Wycliffe Bible Translators, SIL Global (SIL International), YWAM. Global Recordings Network USA is a member of Evangelical Council for Financial Accountability (ECFA) since June 13, 2000. Global Recordings Network USA celebrated the 85th anniversary in 2024. Global Recordings Network has also reached the people in the neighboring communities of countries through the local mission events by distributing the audio and audiovisual materials. The technology has changed so rapidly and those changes make much easier to do the task more efficiently. Global Recordings Network uses Artificial Intelligence (AI), Generative AI (GenAI) and Agentic AI, to help with software development, language researches/applications, and other areas of the ministry. Free downloads of audio recordings are publicly available with PC, tablets, Notebooks, and smartphones. The stuffed animal, like “Tumi Tiger” loaded with the MP3 audio player in any heart languages, is designed to present audio recordings for traumatized children with a one hour of a 40-story set of the chronological Old and New Testament Bible stories.

5fish.org (https://FiveFish.org) and its free app for Android and iPhone celebrated 10th anniversary in 2022. The latest addition to GRN materials is GRNMapApp (https://grnmapapp.org) that pinpoints both the Unengaged Unreached People Groups (UUPGs)/Unreached People Groups (UPGs) and the Reached People Groups by languages and dialects (speech varieties) globally including global refugees in multilayer-and-multipoint maps.

The Global Recordings Network vision statement reads, "That people might hear and understand God's Word in their heart language, especially those who are oral communicators and those who do not have Scriptures in a form they can access." Foundation of Vision and Mission Statements says, "While there is a people group with no effective, culturally appropriate form of gospel communication, Global Recordings Network will seek to provide an appropriate audio or audiovisual resource, no matter how small the language group," to the mission fields to have them recorded by the native speakers rather than the native speakers come to an office/center studio.

== Books ==
- Dave Jackson, Nita Jackson, Race for the Record: Joy Ridderhof, Bethany House Publishers, July 1, 1999
- Rejoice Always: Devotions with Joy Ridderhof, Global Recordings Network Publications, 2009
- Allan Starling, Amazing Stories: From Global Recordings Network, June 9, 2014
- Ribecca Davis, Joy Ridderhof: Voice Catcher Around the World, Potter's Wheel Books, Volume 2, February 2015

== See also ==
- Sound recording and reproduction
- Analog recording
- Digital recording
- Magnetic recording
- Reel-to-reel audio tape recording
- Gramophone record
- Phonograph record
- CardTalk
- History of sound recording
- Industrial Revolution
- Western Electric
- Compact disc
- Oral tradition
- Storytelling
- Recording studio
- Audio engineer
- World language
- Ethnologue
- Artificial Intelligence
