= CardTalk =

Phonographic system

Illustration of the device "Record Player" by Max Meier-Maletz

CardTalk is an inexpensive cardboard phonograph for playing recordings, mainly voice, made on vinyl records. The name was used by Global Recordings Network, a Christian missionary movement which used the device from the 1960s to play religious talks in remote parts of the world that did not have electricity. It consists of a flat piece of cardboard creased and folded into a triangle. The base has a nub to hold the record in place. The upper "arm" forms the apex of the triangle and has a needle which is placed upon the record. The record is spun using a small pointed object like a pencil. The cardboard picks up the impressions on the record and vibrates loud enough to be heard causing the "card" to "talk". Several cardboard phonograph playing devices were patented around the same period and these include Jauquet (1953) for a "Pocket Speaking Device", J.S. Wiener's "Sound Emitting Device" (1967) and the "Record Player" of Max Meier-Maletz (1972).
