= Nonlinear distortion =

Signals phenomenon

Nonlinear distortion (in fields such as electronics, audio and telecommunications) is a term used to describe the phenomenon of a non-linear relationship between the "input" and "output" signals of - for example - an electronic device.

== Model ==
For many devices, a linear model is accurate only for small signal levels. For example, at 2 volts input, a typical audio amplifier might put out 20 V, meaning the linear gain is 10 V/V. For 3 V input, it might then output 30 V. However, the model implies that at 50 V input it would produce 500 V, which is not possible with most amplifiers.

Mathematically, the input-output relationship of many devices should be described by a polynomial or Taylor series, as shown below.

$v = \sum_{k=1}^\infty a_ku^k$

For larger values of u, the higher order coefficients such as $a_2$ and $a_3$ come into play.

== Effects of nonlinearity ==
Nonlinearity can have several effects, which are unwanted in typical situations. For example, when the input is a sine wave with frequency $\omega$, then the $a_3$ term would result in an extra sine wave at $3\omega$, as shown below.

$v = (a_1 + \frac{3}{4}a_3) sin(\omega t) - \frac{1}{4}a_3 sin(3\omega t)$

In certain situations, this spurious signal can be filtered away because the "harmonic" $3\omega$ lies far outside the frequency range used, but in cable television, for example, third order distortion could cause a 200 MHz signal to interfere with the regular channel at 600 MHz.

Nonlinear distortion applied to a superposition of two signals at different frequencies causes the circuit to act as a frequency mixer, creating intermodulation distortion.
