= Global Recordings Network =

Christian organization

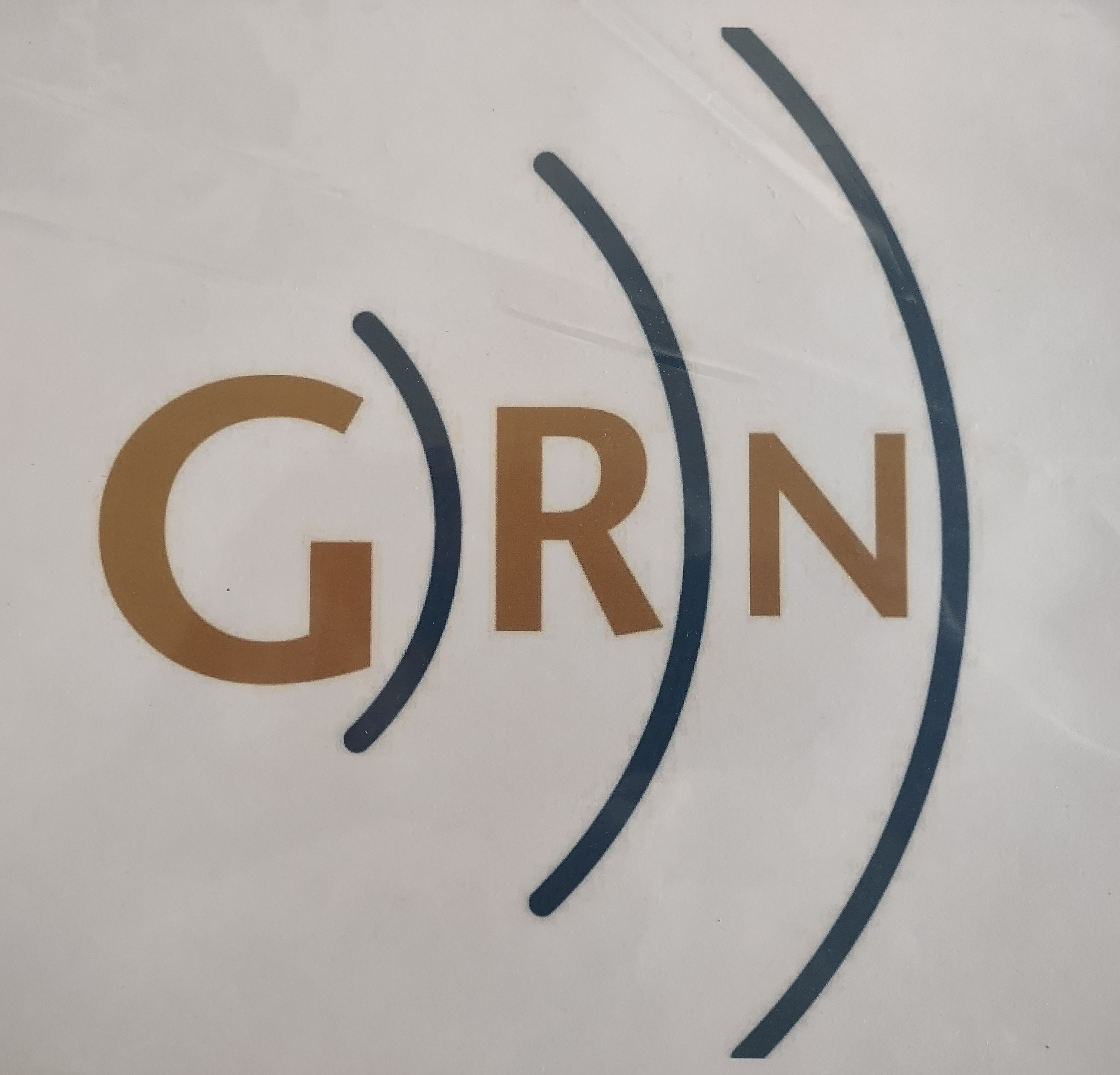
Global Recordings Network (GRN) Logo

Global Recordings Network (GRN) was founded by Joy Ridderhof in Los Angeles, California in 1939 as "Gospel Recordings, Inc." It is also known in different countries as "Audio Recordings Mission," "Grabaciones Buenas Nuevas," "Gravações," "Internationale Sprachen Mission," "Language Recordings," and "Sounds of Language Foundation."

The mission of Global Recordings Network is "In partnership with the church, to effectively communicate the Good News of Jesus Christ by means of culturally appropriate audio and audiovisual materials in every language." This is accomplished by having native speakers of target languages record the stories of the Bible in their own native languages. These recordings are provided to the community by a mother-tongue speaker and providing them in an audio format to churches, mission organizations, and the community at large. Often the languages do not have a written form. Global Recordings Network has offices (centers) and bases in more than 50 countries. The motto of Global Recordings Network is "Telling the story of Jesus in EVERY language."

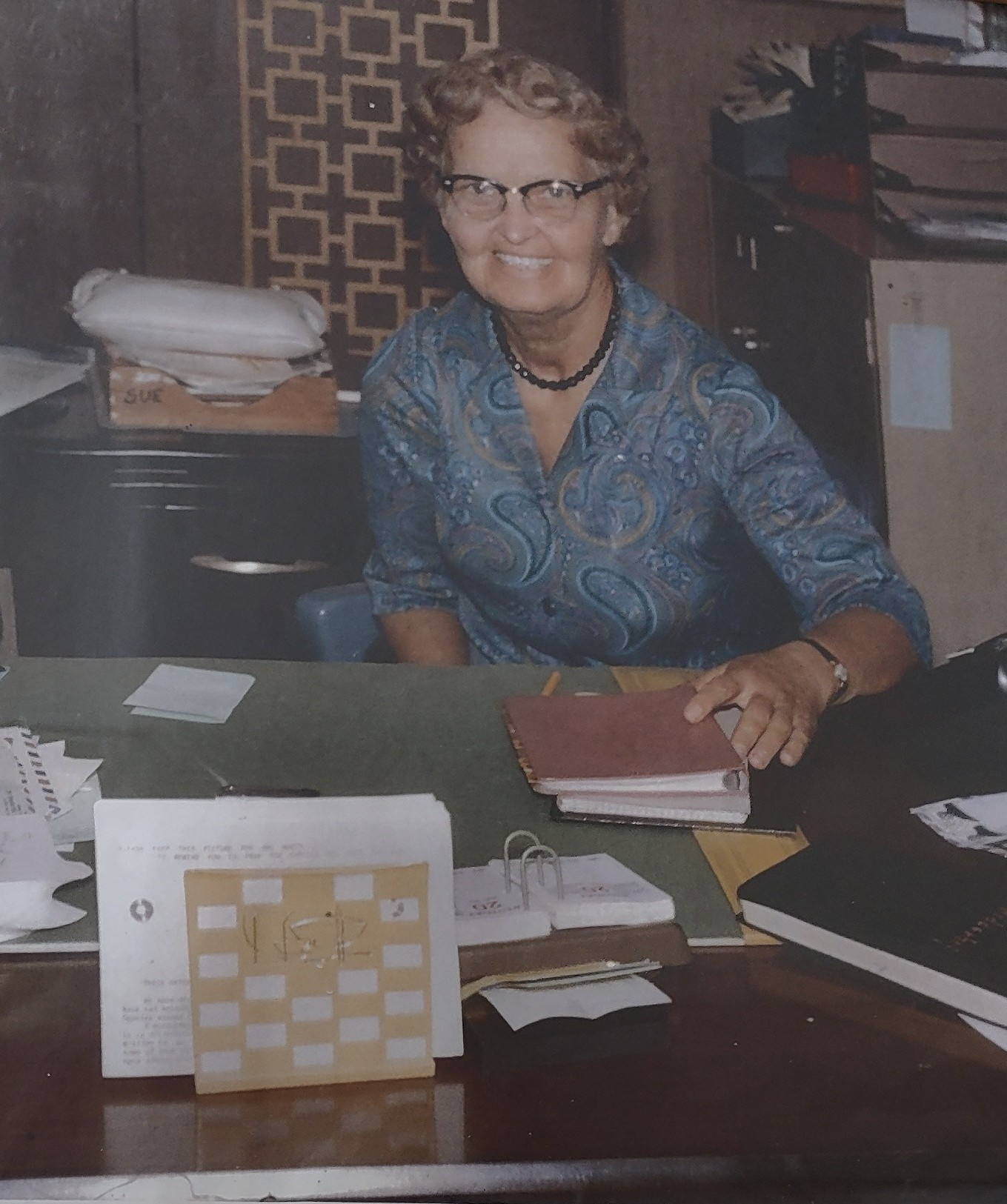
Global Recordings Network Founder Joy Ridderhof at Office / GRN USA Archival Files

The language professor Alexander Arguelles notes that it is possible to use these recordings and the accompanying text in a language the learner knows, to start learning any of the languages. For many there is no other way to learn the language. 1,300 of the languages accompany the stories with standardized pictures, shown for 10–20 seconds, which allow learners to find short parallel sections in the language they know and the one they want to learn.

When Joy Ridderhof was a missionary to Honduras in Central America in 1930s, she remembered gramophones playing hymns in English repeatedly without change. This gave her the idea of having the same thing done in Spanish.

Global Recordings Network is an evangelical faith mission organization to reach out to every language spoken in the world no matter how small the language group is. About two-thirds of the world are basically oral communicators in contrast to the one-thirds who are written communicators. Audio recordings and visual materials are essential means of communication.

Global Recordings Network has produced the gospel recordings in over 6,700 languages and dialects (language varieties or speech varieties) of the estimated over 14,000 languages and varieties (dialects) spoken in the world. About 5.2 billion people are oral learners.

The recordings have been used for linguistic research on rhythm and phonological characteristics, vowels, consonants, for comparative research on phonemes from hundreds of languages, for developing and testing computer systems to recognize languages, and for documenting and reviving rare languages.

== Books ==
- "Mountains Singing" (1952) by Sanna Barlow, the story of Gospel Recordings in the Philippines
- "Capturing Voices" (1978) by Phyllis Thompson, a biography of Joy Ridderhof and Gospel Recordings
- "What Price Obedience" (1982) by Elvie Nicoll, about how a record factory was started in India
- "Along Unfamiliar Paths" (1982) by Marlene Muhr, recounts the travels of early workers in GRN
- "Light Is Sown" by Sanna Morrison Barlow, details recording experiences in Africa in the 1950s
- "Catching Their Talk In A Box" (1987) by Betty M. Hockett, a children's biography from the series "Life-Story from Missions"
- "Lost For Words" (1990) by Stuart Mill, an account of the establishment of Gospel Recordings in Australia
- "Amazing Stories: From Global Recordings Network" (2014) by Allan Starling

== See also ==
- Language education
- SIL Global
- Wycliffe Bible Translators
- Linguistics
- World language
- Evolutionary psychology of language
- Linguistic universal
- Dialect
- Language family
- Proto-language
- Global language system
- ISO 639-5
