= Bible translations into German =

German language translations of the Bible (die Bibel) have existed since the Middle Ages. The most influential is Luther's translation, which established High German as the literary language throughout Germany by the middle of the seventeenth century and which still continues to be most widely used in the German-speaking world today.

== Pre-Lutheran Germanic Bibles ==
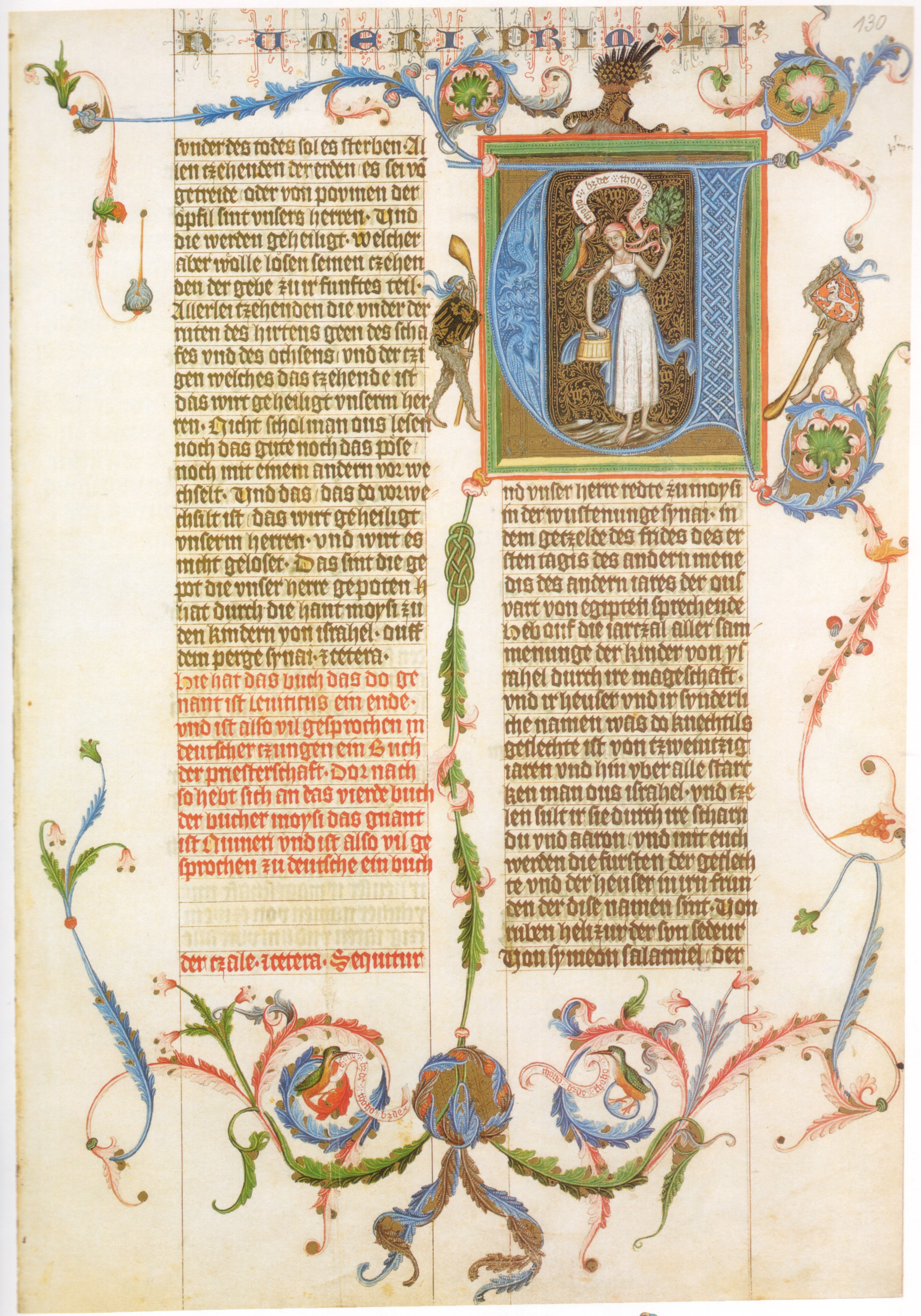
Page from the Wenceslas Bible

The earliest known and partly still available Germanic version of the Bible was the fourth century Gothic translation of Wulfila (c. 311–380). This version, translated primarily from the Greek, recorded or established much of the Germanic Christian vocabulary that is still in use today. There were Bible translations present in manuscript form at a considerable scale already in the thirteenth and the fourteenth century (e.g. the New Testament in the Augsburger Bible of 1350 and the Old Testament in the Wenceslas Bible of 1389). There are still approximately 1,000 manuscripts or manuscript fragments of Medieval German Bible translations extant.

=== Printed Bibles ===
There is ample evidence for the general use of the entire vernacular German Bible in the fifteenth century. In 1466, before Martin Luther was even born, Johannes Mentelin printed the Mentel Bible, a High German vernacular Bible, at Strasbourg. This edition was based on a no-longer-extant fourteenth-century manuscript translation of the Vulgate from the area of Nuremberg. By 1518, it had been reprinted at least 13 times.

The Sensenschmidt Bible was published around 1476‒1478. In 1478–1479, two editions were published in Cologne, one in the Low Rhenish dialect and another in Low Saxon. In 1483, the Koberger was printed . In 1494, another Low German Bible was published in the dialect of Lübeck, and in 1522, the last pre-Lutheran Bible, the Low Saxon Halberstadt Bible was published.

In 1477, in Delft, Holland, an Old Testament (except the Psalms) was printed in Middle Dutch. An accompanying New Testament seems to have been lost.

In total, there were at least eighteen Catholic complete German Bible editions, ninety editions in the vernacular of the Gospels and the readings of the Sundays and Holy Days, and some fourteen German Psalters by the time Luther first published his own New Testament translation. An Anabaptist translation of the Prophets by Ludwig Hetzer and Hans Denck was published at Worms in 1529.

==== Overview of the German Bibles before Luther ====
Name	Year	Place of printing	Printer/Illustrator	Chronological order
Mentelin-Bibel	1466	Straßburg	Johannes Mentelin	1.
Eggestein-Bibel	vor 1470	Straßburg	Heinrich Eggestein	2.
Zainer-Bibel	1475	Augsburg	Günther Zainer	3./4.
Pflanzmann-Bibel	1475	Augsburg	Jodocus Pflanzmann	4./3.
Sensenschmidt-Bibel	1476–78	Nürnberg	Andreas Frisner, Johann Sensenschmidt	5.
Zainer-Bibel	1477	Augsburg	Günther Zainer	6.
Sorg-Bibel	1477	Augsburg	Anton Sorg	7.
Kölner Bibeln	1478/79	Köln	Heinrich Quentell oder Bartholomäus von Unckell	Low Rhenish
Kölner Bibeln	1478/79	Köln	Heinrich Quentell oder Bartholomäus von Unckell	Low Saxon
Sorg-Bibel	1480	Augsburg	Anton Sorg	8.
Koberger-Bibel	1483	Nürnberg	Anton Koberger	9.
Grüninger-Bibel	1485	Straßburg	Johann Grüninger	10.
Schönsperger-Bibel	1487	Augsburg	Johann Schönsperger d. Ä.	11.
Schönsperger-Bibel	1490	Augsburg	Johann Schönsperger d. Ä.	12.
Lübecker Bibel (1494)	1494	Lübeck	Steffen Arndes/Meister der Lübecker Bibel	Low Saxon
Otmar-Bibel	1507	Augsburg	Johann Otmar	13.
Otmar-Bibel	1518	Augsburg	Silvan Otmar	14.
Halberstädter Bibel	1522	Halberstadt	Lorenz Stuchs	Low Saxon

== Luther's Bible ==
The most important and influential translation of the Bible into German is the Luther Bible: the initial New Testament was released in 1522 (the "September Bible"); this was the first German translation notionally from (Erasmus') Greek and not translated only from the Latin Vulgate. Translations of Old Testament books were released incrementally, completed in 1534, again with reference to the Hebrew.

The influence that Martin Luther's translation had on the development of the German language is often compared to the influence the King James Version had on English.

The Luther Bible was revised in 1984, and this version was adapted to the new German orthography in 1999. Here also some revisions have taken place, e.g. "Weib" > "Frau". Despite the revisions, the language is still somewhat archaic and difficult for non-native speakers who want to learn the German language using a German translation of the Bible.

In 2017, on the 500th anniversary of Reformation Day, a completely revised version of the Luther Bible was published. This is the translation currently in use. In the 2017 Luther Bible some of the text that had been 'toned down' in previous revisions has been reverted to Luther's stronger formulations.

== Other translations after Luther's New Testament ==
=== Froschauer Bible ===
Zwingli's High Alemannic German (Swiss German) translation grew out of the Prophezey, an exegetical workshop taking place on every weekday, with the participation of all clerics of Zürich, working at a German rendition of Bible texts for the benefit of the congregation. The translation of Martin Luther was used as far as it was already completed. This helped Zwingli to complete the entire translation five years before Luther. At the printing shop of Christoph Froschauer, the New Testament appeared from 1525 to 1529, and later parts of the Old Testament, with a complete translation in a single volume first printed in 1531, with an introduction by Zwingli and summaries of each chapter. This Froschauer Bible, containing more than 200 illustrations, became notable as a masterpiece of printing at the time. The translation is mainly due to Zwingli and his friend Leo Jud, pastor at the St. Peter parish. The translation of the Old Testament was revised in 1540, that of the New Testament in 1574. Verse numbering was introduced in 1589.

=== Catholic ===
Catholic translations continued to be produced: in 1526, Beringer's translation of the New Testament was published at Speyer. In 1527, Hieronymus Emser did a translation of the New Testament based on Luther's translation and the Vulgate. In 1534, Johann Dietenberger, OP, used Emser's New Testament and Leo Jud's translation of the deuterocanonical books in a complete Bible published at Mainz; both Emser's and Dietenberger's prose partly followed the style of the pre-Lutheran translations. The Dietenberger Bible was published in various revisions. Kaspar Ulenberg's revision was published at Mainz in 1617, and at Cologne in 1630. Ulenberg's revision was the basis for the "Catholic Bible," the revision by Jesuit theologians published at Mainz in 1661, 1662, and so on. Th. Erhard, OSB, did a revision published at Augsburg in 1722, which was in its sixth edition by 1748. G. Cartier's revision was published at Konstanz in 1751. The revision by Ignatius von Weitenauer, SJ, was published at Augsburg in twelve volumes from 1783 to 1789.

=== Mendelssohn ===
Moses Mendelssohn (a.k.a. Moses ben Menahem-Mendel and Moses Dessau; 1729–86) translated part of the Torah into German, which was published in Amsterdam in 1778. The translation was honored by some Jews and Protestants, while some Jews banned it. The whole Pentateuch and Psalms was published in 1783, and was appreciated even in Christian circles. His version of the Song of Solomon was posthumously published in 1788.

=== Later Bible translations ===
A Reformed translation by Johannes Piscator was published at Herborn from 1602 to 1604. Johannes Crellius (1599–1633) and Joachim Stegmann, Sr., did a German version of the Socinians' Racovian New Testament, published at Raków in 1630. A Jewish translation of the Tanakh by Athias was published in 1666, and reprinted in the Biblia Pentapla at Hamburg in 1711.

Daniel Gotthilf Moldenhawer's translation was published in 1774, Simon Grynaeus' in 1776, and Vögelin's of the new testament in 1781.

Heinrich Braun, OSB, did a new translation of the Vulgate, published at Augsburg from 1788 to 1797. Johann Michael Feder's revision of this was published at Nuremberg in 1803. Feder's revision was the basis of Joseph Franz Allioli's revision, published at Landshut in 1830 and 1832, and often republished. Dominic de Brentano translated the New Testament and the Pentateuch and Anton Dereser translated the rest of the Bible; this was published at Frankfurt in sixteen volumes from 1815 to 1828, and then was revised by Johann Martin Augustin Scholz and published in seventeen volumes from 1828 to 1837.

Wilhelm Martin Leberecht de Wette and Johann Christian Wilhelm Augusti did a translation that was published at Heidelberg from 1809 to 1814, and the revision by Wette was published from 1831 to 1833. Rabbi Michael Sachs worked with Arnheim and Füchs on a new translation of the Tenakh published at Berlin in 1838.

Loch and Reischl did a translation from the Vulgate, compared with the Hebrew, Aramaic, and Greek, published at Regensburg from 1851 to 1866.

== Contemporary Bible translations ==
A modern German translation is the Catholic Einheitsübersetzung ("unified" or "unity translation"), so called because it was the first common translation used for all Catholic German-speaking dioceses. The text of the New Testament and the Psalms of the Einheitsübersetzung was agreed on by a committee of Catholic and Protestant scholars, and therefore was originally intended to be used by both Roman Catholics and Protestants especially for ecumenical services, while the remainder of the Old Testament follows a Catholic tradition. In 2005, the Protestant Church of Germany stopped supporting the Einheitsübersetzung due concern that the translation principles outlined prescribed by Liturgiam authenticam would be too restrictive for the Catholic translators and make an ecumenical Bible impossible.

== Well-known German language Bible versions ==
Name	Literally translated name	Scope	Short Name	Translator	Current publisher	First publication year	Current revision year
Luther Bible				Martin Luther	Deutsche Bibelgesellschaft	1522-34	2017
Zürcher Bibel					Theologischer Verlag Zürich / Deutsche Bibelgesellschaft	1524-1531	2007
Elberfelder (Darby Bible)				Carl Brockhaus et al.	SCM R. Brockhaus	1855	2006
Schlachter				Franz Eugen Schlachter	Société Biblique de Genève	1905	2000
Die Schrift (Buber-Rosenzweig)	The Scripture	Old Testament		Martin Buber, Franz Rosenzweig	Deutsche Bibelgesellschaft	1926-38	1962
Pattloch					Pattloch	1956?	1962/75
Bruns				Hans Bruns	Brunnen	1961	1993
Herder					Herder	1964	2005
Menge				Hermann Menge	public domain / Christliche Literatur-Verbreitung (CLV)	1909-26	2019
Gute Nachricht Bibel	Good news				Deutsche Bibelgesellschaft	1968-82	2018
Einheitsübersetzung	Unity translation				Katholisches Bibelwerk	1980	2016
Hoffnung für Alle	Hope for all		HfA		Biblica / Fontis	1983-96	2015
Neue Genfer Übersetzung	New Geneva translation	New Testament, Psalms, Proverbs	NGÜ		Société Biblique de Genève / Brunnen / Deutsche Bibelgesellschaft	2000-current	
Neues Lebel. Die Bibel	New life. The Bible				SCM R.Brockhaus	2002	2024
Neue evangelistische Übersetzung (bibel.heute)	New evangelical translation		NeÜ	Karl-Heinz Vanheiden	Karl-Heinz Vanheiden / Christliche Verlagsgesellschaft	2003-10	
BasisBibel	Basic Bible				Deutsche Bibelgesellschaft	2006 - 2021	
Das Buch	The book	New Testament, Psalms, Proverbs		Roland Werner	SCM R.Brockhaus	2009-14	
Bibel in gerechter Sprache	Bible in equitable language		BigS		Gütersloher Verlagshaus	2006	2011

More extensive lists / comparison of Bible translations in German can be found at

- https://bibelberater.de/bibeluebersetzung/
- https://www.bibelcenter.de/bibel/bibeln/dt-bibeln.php

== See also ==
- Deutsche Bibelgesellschaft
- Tseno Ureno
- Bibelarchiv Vegelahn: Bible translations in german
- Calov Bible
- Elector Bible
- Johann Albrecht Bengel
