= Schlachter =

Schlachter or Schlächter is an occupational surname literally meaning butcher, slaughterer in German. Notable people with the surname include:

- Chris Schlachter (1894–????), American football player
- Dirk Schlächter (born 1965), German bassist
- Franz Eugen Schlachter (1859–1911), German preacher, scholar and translator
- Marvin Schlachter (1933–2024), American record company music executive and record label owner
- Philipp Schlachter (1841–1923), German-born American soldier
- Ricardo Schlachter (born 1977), Brazilian tennis player
- Steve Schlachter (born 1954), American-Israeli basketball player

== See also ==
- Schlachter Bible, German translation of the Bible by Franz Eugen Schlachter
- Schlechter
