= Allioli =

Allioli may refer to:

- Allioli, the Catalan variant of the garlic sauce Aioli
- Joseph Franz von Allioli (1793–1873), Roman Catholic theologian and orientalist
