= Société Biblique de Genève =

The Société Biblique de Genève [Geneva Bible Society] is a non-denominational Bible society based in Geneva, Switzerland.

== History ==
The Geneva Bible Society was founded in Switzerland in 1917 by Hugh Edward Alexander, founder of the Églises Action Biblique. The first bookshop opened in Paris in 1925. Others were set up in various countries around the world. In 1943, the Geneva Bible Society was officially registered in Geneva. Her publications include the Segond Bible, the Segond 21 Bible and the New Geneva Edition 1979 (NEG1979).

The activity initially began through missionary bookshops, then called "Depot of the Holy Scriptures". The beginning was first in Geneva in 1917, then in Paris in 1925 under the name "House of the Bible", in Zurich in 1933, and then in several countries on three continents. Since 1997, the head office has been in Romanel-sur-Lausanne. There are currently 20 Bible Houses in France, Switzerland, Italy and Côte d'Ivoire.

After the Second World War, it took over the publication and revision of the Schlachter Bible, which appeared in 1951. A special edition of the New Testament was published as early as 1945, when the Scripture Gift Mission distributed hundreds of thousands of New Testaments among German prisoners of war in British captivity. This edition was based on a slightly edited text of the original miniature Bible by Franz Eugen Schlachter from 1905.

In 1995, the Geneva Bible Society commissioned the third full revision of the Schlachter Bible. In 2003, this revision, generally referred to as "Schlachter 2000", was published as a full Bible; it is now available in various editions. A concordance to the Schlachter Bible is currently in progress.

== Critiques ==
In 2017, Catholic publisher Nicolas-Jean Sed, Dominican director of Le Cerf, accused the Société biblique de Genève, responsible for the Bible Segond 21 translation, of destabilizing the market with its very low price and of being fundamentalist by not being a member of the Universal Bible Alliance. The director of the Geneva Bible Society, Jean-Pierre Bezin, responded by saying that he wanted to make the Bible accessible to all and could not be fundamentalist, since he had collaborated with the Catholic publisher Salvator.

== Present ==
The Geneva Bible Society makes the Bible available free of charge or at the lowest possible price. The New Geneva Translation has been published since 1988. Initially only individual Bible books were published, but since 2000 the New Testament, and since 2011 the New Testament and Psalms in one volume.

The Geneva Bible Society is independent of all political and religious organizations. From 1998 to 2006, it printed 115,000 Bibles per year, and 800,000 per year from 2007 to 2011. In 2011, 35 percent of the total project expenditure of 650,000 Swiss francs was used for Bible projects, 17 percent to support Christian bookshops and 15 percent for evangelistic purposes.
