= Konrad Hagius =

German composer

Konrad Hagius (also Conrad von Hagen and Cunradus Hagius Rinteleus; Rinteln, c. 1550–1616) was a German composer.

He studied in Königsberg, then by 1586 was in Düsseldorf in the service of John William, Duke of Jülich-Cleves-Berg. Then at the Heidelberg court.

Among his works are The Psalms of David in the translation of Kaspar Ulenberg (publ. in Düsseldorf, 1589), reprinted in the series Denkmäler Rheinischer Musik .
