= Schlechter =

Schlechter is a family surname of German origin. Derived from the high German surname Schlachter, the name hails from the Bavarian region and was typically given to families within the butcher professions. Notable people with the surname include:

- Carl Schlechter (1874–1918), Austrian chess master
- Emanuel Schlechter (1906–1943), Polish lyricist, composer, and writer
- Lambert Schlechter (born 1941), Luxembourg author
- Rudolf Schlechter (1872–1925), German taxonomist

== See also ==
- Schlachter
