= Mein Hirt ist Gott der Herr =

Hymn with German text paraphrasing Psalm 23

- Christian hymn
- Written: 1582
- Text: by Caspar Ulenberg
- Language: German
- Based on: Psalm 23
- Melody: by Johannes Hatzfeld
- Composed: 1948

"Mein Hirt ist Gott der Herr" (My shepherd is God the Lord) is a Christian hymn with German text by Caspar Ulenberg who paraphrased Psalm 23 in 1582. Based on his melody, Johannes Hatzfeld wrote a melody in 1948.

== History ==
Caspar Ulenberg paraphrased Psalm 23 (The Lord is my shepherd) in 1582. In the Catholic hymnal Gotteslob, it is GL 421, in the section "Leben in Gott - Vertrauen und Trost" (Life in God – trust and consolation). The song is in four stanzas in bar form. it is part of several hymnals.
