= Nun lobet Gott im hohen Thron =

Christian hymn

- Christian hymn
- Written: by Caspar Ulenberg
- Language: German
- Based on: Psalm 117
- Composed: by Ulenberg
- Published: 1603

"Nun lobet Gott im hohen Thron" ( lit.: Now praise God on a high throne) is a Christian hymn in German, published in 1603. Caspar Ulenberg wrote it in 1582, based on Psalm 117, and modified a 1542 melody by Guillaume Franc. It is part of German hymnals, including the German Catholic hymnal Gotteslob, which has it as GL 393 in the section "Leben in Gott – Lob, Dank und Anbetung" (Life in God – Praise, thanks and adoration). It is also part of other hymnals and songbooks.

The text consists of three stanzas of four lines each, rhyming AABB.
