= Kaspar Ulenberg =

German theological writer and translator

Kaspar Ulenberg (24 December 1549 – 16 February 1617) was a Catholic convert, theological writer and translator of the Bible.

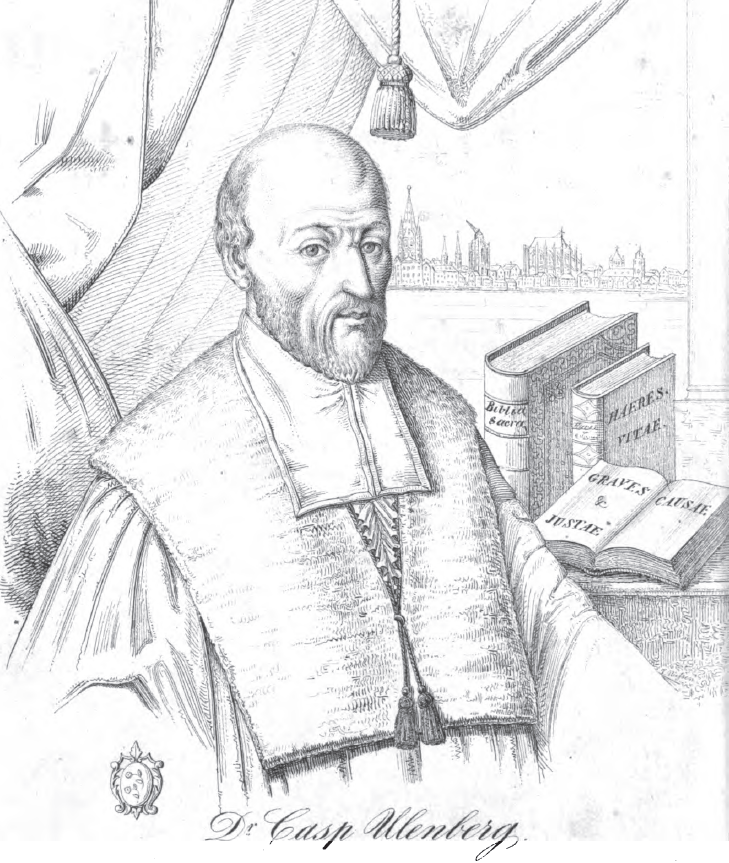
Kaspar Ulenberg, 19th-century drawing

He was born at Lippstadt on the Lippe, Westphalia, the son of Lutheran parents, and was intended for the Lutheran ministry. He received his grammar-school education in Lippstadt, Soest, and Brunswick, and from 1569 studied theology at Wittenberg. While studying Luther's writings there his first doubts as to the truth of the Lutheran doctrines were awakened, and were then increased by hearing the disputes between the Protestant theologians and by the appearance of Calvinism in Saxony. After completing his studies he taught for a short time in the Latin school at Lunden in Dithmarschen; he was then sent by his family to Cologne to convert to Protestantism a kinsman who had become Catholic. After accomplishing this task he remained in Cologne, where, through his friendship with Johann Nopelius and Gerwin Calenius (Catholic countrymen of his), he had an opportunity of becoming acquainted with Catholic life and teaching.

In 1572 he became a Catholic, and soon afterwards, upon obtaining degrees in philosophy at the University of Cologne, became professor at the Gymnasium Laurentianum at Cologne. In 1575 he was ordained priest and became parish priest at Kaiserswerth. In 1583 he was made parish priest of St. Cunibert's in Cologne, where he laboured zealously by preaching and catechetical exercises, and made many conversions. In 1593 he became regent of the Laurentian gymnasium, retaining this position for twenty-two years. From 1600 to 1606 he directed the education of princes Wilhelm and Hermann of Baden, sons of Margrave Edward Fortunatus of Baden-Baden. In 1605 he became parish priest of St. Kolumba, Cologne, and from 1610 to 1612 was also rector of the university there. He died at Cologne.

== Literary career ==
Ulenberg began his literary career at Kaiserwerth with the work, "Die Psalmen David's in allerlei deutsche Gesangreime gebracht" (Cologne, 1582), an excellent hymn book for the common people, which was widely circulated and often reprinted; the last and revised edition was by M. Kaufmann (Augsburg, 1835). To the first edition was appended a "Katechismus oder kurzer Bericht der ganzen christl. kathol. Religion sammt Warnung wider allerlei unserer Zeit Irrthumb". He completed at Cologne (1589) his chief theological work, "Erhebliche und wichtige Ursachen, warumb die altgläubige Catholische Christen bei dem alten wahren Christenthumb bis in ihren Tod beständiglich verharren", of which he also issued a Latin edition entitled: "Causae graves et justae, cur Catholicis in communione veteris ejusque veri Christianismi constanter usque ad finem vitae permanendum, cur item omnibus, qui se Evangelicos vocant, relictis erroribus ad ejusdem Christianismi consortium vel postliminio redeundum sit". This is one of the best controversial treatises of the 16th century and is still instructive reading. A new and revised edition was prepared by M.W. Kerp entitled: "Zweiundzwanzig Beweggründe. Ein buch für Katholische und Evangelische" (Mainz, 1827, 1833, and 1840). Other works worthy of mention are:

- "Trostbuch für die Kranken und Sterbenden" (Cologne, 1590), often reprinted;
- "Historia de vita, moribus, rebus gestis, studiis ac denique morte Praedicantium Lutheranorum, D. Martini Lutheri, Philippi Melanchthonis, Matthiae Flacii Illyrici, Georgii Maioris, et Andraea Osiandri", which was edited after Ulenberg's death by Arnold Meshovius (1622), a German edition being issued at Mainz (2 vols., 1836–37).
- Ulenberg also wrote various shorter polemical and ascetical treatises. His last and most important literary work (Sacra Biblia, das ist, die gantze Heilige Schrifft, Alten und Neuen Testaments, nach der letzten Römisch Sixtiner Edition mit fleiss übergesetxt), the German translation of the Bible, he began (1614) at the request of the Archbishop and Elector of Cologne, Ferdinand Duke of Bavaria, and finished shortly before his death. The first edition appeared at Cologne in 1630; eleven other editions were published at Cologne up to 1747, and eleven more at Nuremberg, Bamberg, Frankfort, and Vienna.
- The German Bible which was published (Mainz, 1662) at the command of the Archbishop and Elector of Mainz, Johann Philip Count of Schönborn, was a revision of Ulenberg's translation. This revision, entitled "Die catholische Mainzer Bibel", is still frequently printed and until Joseph Franz Allioli's translation appeared was the most popular German translation of the Bible.

== Selected works ==
The Bible, Cologne 1630.

Brought the Psalms of David in all sorts of German singing rhymes, such as "Mein Hirt ist Gott der Herr" after Psalm 23, and "Nun lobet Gott im hohen Thron" after Psalm 117

Book of comfort for the sick and dying, 1590 and more.

Praise of God No 164.

Gotteslob # 265.

Gotteslob # 635.

Significant and important reasons why the orthodox Catholic Christians remain in the old beständiglich true Christianity to their death:

Simplistic explanation of the seven Penitential Psalms, 1586.

A beautifully made new song 1583.

Historia de vita ..., DM Lutheran, Ph. Melanchthonis, Matthiae Flacii Illyrici, Georgii et Andreae Osiandri Majoris, Cologne 1622.

Historia Zwingli (ungedr.).

== Musical interpretations of his works ==
- Die Psalmen Davids in allerlei Teutsche gesang-reimen gebracht (the Psalms of David in German verse), Colone, 1582. Digitized edition (facsimile)
- Die Psalmen Davids (The Psalms of David) set to music for four voices of Cunradus Hagius Rinteleus (1550–1616), Düsseldorf Dorff: Buyss, 1589. Modern edition published in the series Monuments Rhenish Music. Digitized edition (facsimile) of the original edition University and State Library Düsseldorf.
- Teutsche Psalmen (German Psalms) set to three parts by Orlando di Lasso and Rudolph di Lasso - Munich: Berg, 1588. Digitalised edition (facsimile) by the Bavarian State Library
- Motet-like settings for the Ulenberg Psalter set to two to four parts by Christoph Dalitz, 2016, published under music.dalitio.de
