= Joseph Franz von Allioli =

German Roman Catholic theologian and orientalist

Joseph Franz von Allioli (10 August 1793 at Sulzbach, Germany – 22 May 1873 at Augsburg, Germany) was a Roman Catholic theologian and orientalist. Allioli studied theology at Landshut and was ordained at Ratisbon in 1816, and eventually became canon residentiary in Augsburg. He is most renowned for his translation of the Old and New Testaments, the 6-volume "Übersetzung der heiligen Schriften Alten und Neuen Testaments aus der Vulgata", published between 1830 and 1835. Based on Jerome’s Latin Vulgate, it was the first German Bible to receive the imprimatur of the Catholic Church, in whose eyes Martin Luther’s enormously influential 16th-century translation was the unacceptable work of a Protestant heretic. Allioli's Bible was read widely in his lifetime and was, until replaced by a new translation called Einheitsübersetzung, the standard Scripture of German Catholicism. From 1818 to 1820, he studied Semitic languages at Vienna, Rome, and Paris. He taught Hebrew language, used his knowledge of it to write about the Bible, and wrote an 11-stanza poem in Hebrew titled "In Praise of the Hebrew Language", the first stanza of which reads: Thou, child of heaven, mistress of all tongues, Exalted art thou from primeval time By He who dwelt betwixt the cherubim. From on high He descended on His holy mount With pen of fire to engrave thee on twin tablets, His flame emblazoning thee upon them.

He became professor in the University at Landshut in 1824, and was transferred with the university to Munich in 1826. Owing to a weak throat, he had to accept a canonry at Ratisbon in 1835, and became Dean of the chapter at Augsburg, in 1838.

== Works ==
- "Aphorismen über den Zusammenhang der heiligen Schrift Alten und Neuen Testaments, aus der Idee des Reichs Gottes" (Ratisbon 1819)
- "Häusliche Alterthümer der Hebräer nebst biblischer Geographie" (1821)
- "Biblische Alterthümer" (Landshut, 1825)
- "Handbuch der biblischen Alterthumskunde" (in cooperation with Grätz and Haneberg, Landshut, 1843–44)
- "Übersetzung der heiligen Schriften Alten und Neuen Testaments, aus der Vulgata, mit Bezug auf den Grundtext, neu übersetzt und mit kurzen Anmerkungen erläutert, dritte Auflage von Allioli umgearbeitet" (6 vols., Nürnberg, 1830-35). This work received a papal approbation, 11 May, 1830.
