= Johann Michael Feder =

German Roman Catholic theologian

Johann Michael Feder (25 May 1753 at Oellingen in Bavaria – 26 July 1824 at Würzburg) was a German Roman Catholic theologian.

== Life ==
He studied in the episcopal seminary of Würzburg from 1772–1777; in the latter year he was ordained priest and promoted to the licentiate in theology. For several years Feder was chaplain of the Julius hospital; in 1785 he was appointed extraordinary professor of theology and Semitic languages at the University of Würzburg. He was created a Doctor of Divinity in 1786; director of the university library 1791, ordinary professor of theology and censor of theological publications, 1795.

After the reorganization of the University of Würzburg, 1803-4, he was appointed chief librarian, resigning the professorship of theology in 1805. Shortly after his removal from office as librarian, November, 1811, he suffered a stroke of apoplexy, from which he never fully recovered.
