= Einheitsübersetzung =

German translation of the Bible used by the Catholic church

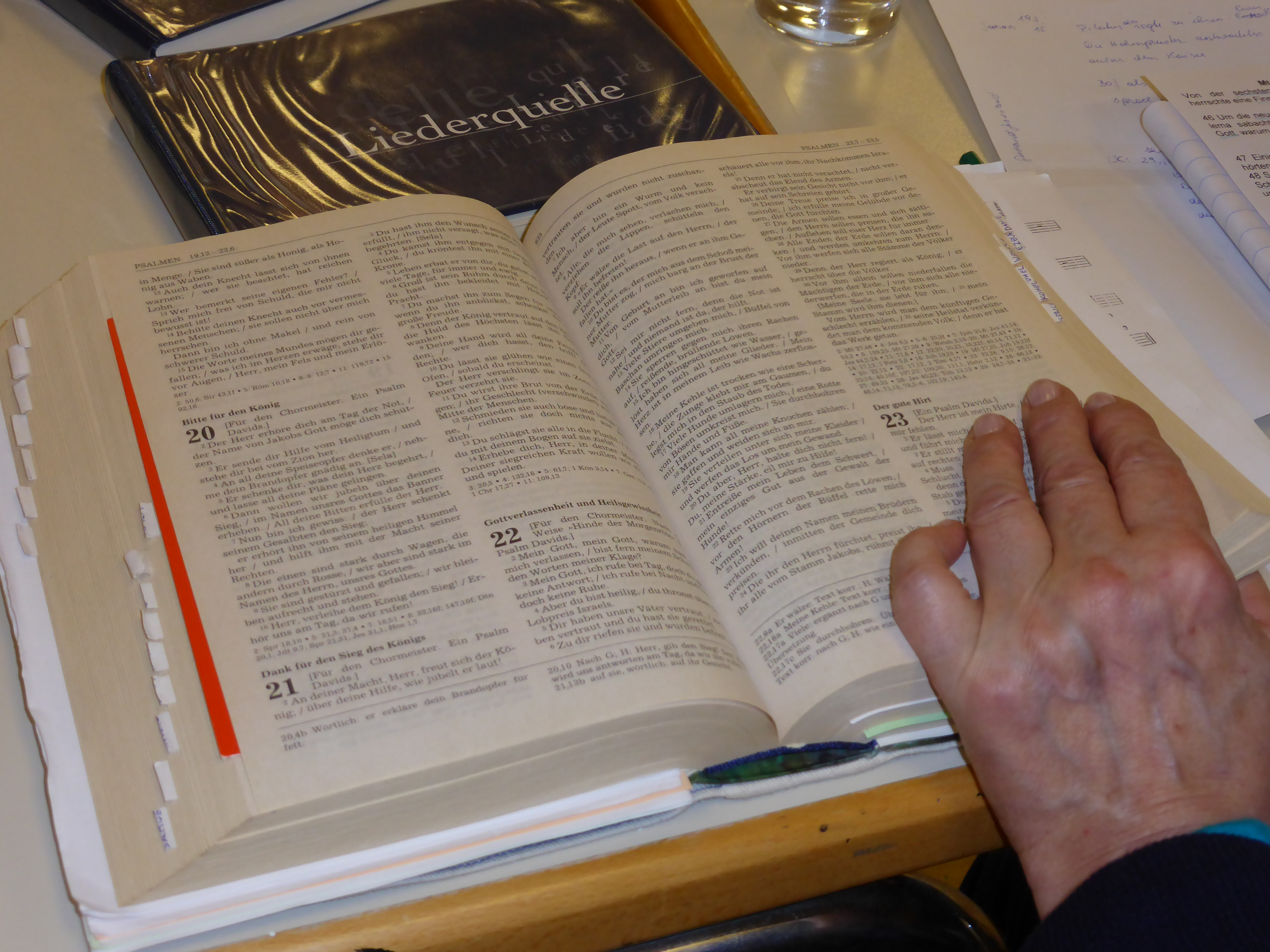
An edition of the Einheitsübersetzung (1980), opened to the Book of Psalms

Einheitsübersetzung (EÜ) ("Unified" or "Unity Translation") is a German translation of the Bible for liturgical use in Roman Catholic worship. It is published by the Katholisches Bibelwerk ("Catholic Bible Society") and was compiled from 1962 to 1980 by Catholic theologians with contributions from Protestant theologians. Collaboration was done on the New Testament and the Psalms. The Protestant side withdrew support from a project revising the Einheitsübersetzung in 2005.

== Beginnings ==
The compiling of the Einheitsübersetzung is a consequence of the reforms of the Second Vatican Council. Vatican II authorized the use of non-Latin languages in the Mass and allowed the local languages into the liturgy. A compilation of new translations of the Bible became urgently needed for the liturgical use in local languages: "the Church by her authority and with maternal concern sees to it that suitable and correct translations are made into different languages". (Dei verbum, 22)

== Name and purpose ==
The Einheitsübersetzung was supposed to become the uniform Bible of all German-speaking Roman Catholic dioceses. The name 'Einheitsübersetzung' reflects this goal. Contrary to a widely spread misunderstanding, the name does not mean that a common translation of the Bible by the Roman Catholic and Protestant churches should be created. Protestant theologians were indeed involved since the beginning of the work, but a replacement for the Luther Translation of the Bible used by Protestant churches was never intended.

The Einheitsübersetzung is designed for the complete religious life, from religious instruction to worship. Linguistic comprehensibility and poetic style were considered. Linguists and experts in liturgy, catechetics, didactics, educational media, and sacred music worked with the theologians to secure the comprehensive usability.

The comprehensive introductions to the individual biblical books which include historical Bible criticism, as well as the numerous explanations of the text, contribute to the understandability and wide application potential.

== Text sources ==
The objective of the Second Vatican Council was to produce a "suitable and correct" translation of the Bible "especially from the original texts of the sacred books". The preeminence of the Latin Vulgate in the Roman Catholic Church up to that point was abandoned. That gave the Catholic theologians the challenge of translating from the Hebrew, Aramaic, and Greek into German, instead of the usual practice of translating the Latin Bible into German. The Roman Catholic Church thus solved one of the conflicts of the Reformation that demanded a return from the Vulgate to the original sources.

== Testing and acceptance ==
The translation work lasted from 1962 to 1974, after which the translation was tried in practice then reworked from 1975 to 1978. In 1978, the final edition was accepted by the German Bishops' Conference. Since then, the Einheitsübersetzung has proven that it has accomplished its purpose and has become the official text source for religious life in the German-speaking dioceses.

== Ecumenical meaning and revision ==
Protestant theologians from the Protestant Brotherhood of St. Michael, a part of the Berneuchen Movement, worked on the Einheitsübersetzung from the start. They did not yet have an official commission from the Catholic Church. The Protestant Church in Germany (Evangelische Kirche in Deutschland, abbreviated EKD) was officially requested to work on the translation of the Psalms and the New Testament. In 1970, the Bishops' Conference and the EKD entered a contract for the joint work on the Einheitsübersetzung, which was a major breakthrough of ecumenism in Germany. Since 1980, the Einheitsübersetzung has also been approved for use in Protestant churches and is especially used with the Luther Translation for ecumenical events.

In the last few years, the Bishops' Conference has attempted a revision of the translation. The revision was also supposed to be a joint project with the Protestant church. A conflict between the Roman Catholic church and the Protestant side arose during the work which resulted in the EKD terminating the 1970 contract in 2005. The conflict arose from disagreements about the Roman Catholic side's push for a heavier emphasis on traditions and Magisterial interpretation following the publication of the instruction Liturgiam authenticam from the Vatican. The consensus decision-making process used up to that point did not hold, after which common ground between the denominations had to be found. After the completion of the revision it had to be submitted for a Papal Approbation, which was also rejected by the EKD. The new edition (February 2010) prefers gender-neutral wording and does not render the name Jahweh.

The reactions to the failure of the joint translation were varied. The Catholic side reacted with incomprehension. The chairman of the Bishops' Conference at the time, Karl Lehmann, spoke of a "considerable burden" for the ecumenism and suddenly put the blame on the EKD representatives without clarification. The EKD also regretted the development, but explained that it "made every imaginable effort to avoid the current result".

The revised standard version became available in December 2016.

== See also ==
- Bible translations
