= Schlachter Bible =

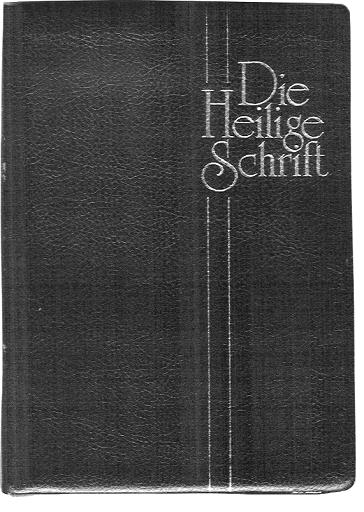

The Schlachter-Bibel is a German translation of the Bible by Franz Eugen Schlachter, first translated from the Greek and Hebrew text of the Bible in 1905. Schlachter was a preacher of the Evangelische Gesellschaft in Bern, Switzerland influenced by the holiness movement.

Schlachter initially published the Book of Job in 1893. In 1905, the so-called Miniaturbibel was published, the first German language Bible version in the twentieth century. The Miniatur-Bible was one of the smallest Bibles ever printed in the German language. It is very thin with very legible printing. The Bible would fit in any of the pockets of a man's jacket. This was followed by the house-bible (Hausbibel), published in 1907, and the hand-bible (Handbibel) published in 1908. The last edition of the original Miniaturbibel was published in 1911.

The translation was concordant, and at the same time, the language flowed well. The reader could discern the meaning of the original text. By 1911, the year of Schlachter's death, he had completed 13 editions of his Bible.

In 1918, two Swiss pastors named Linder and Kappeler revised the Schlachter Bible, and the Genfer Bibelgesellschaft led a new revision of the translation in 1951, although it was a light revision. The text was faithful to Schlachter's original and had only been edited slightly. In 2003, the last revision, called the Schlachter Version 2000, was completed. This version follows the same approach as the original Miniaturbibel, but is also very accurate to the Greek and Hebrew original. The new edition also includes many references.

All editions of the Schlachter Bible came in three formats: there was a pocket-edition, a hand-edition, and a greater family-edition.

== Further reading (German language) ==
- Franz Eugen Schlachter, ein Beitrag zur Geschichte und Theologie der Gemeinschaftsbewegung im Kanton Bern – Akzessarbeit von Walter Wieland, evang. theol. Fakultät der Uni Bern, eingereicht bei Prof. Dr. A. Lindt im Sommer-Semester 1982, Edition Neues Leben, Lützelflühstr. CH 3452 Grünenmatt
- Gottfried Wüthrich: Franz Eugen Schlachter - sein Leben und Wirken, Genf, 16. März 2002 Manuskriptdruck
- Karl-Hermann Kauffmann: Franz Eugen Schlachter und die Heiligungsbewegung, Biographie unter Bezugnahme auf das geistliche Umfeld Schlachters und mit einer kurzen Geschichte der Schlachter Bibel, ausführliche Fassung mit 100 Abbildungen. Gedenkschrift zum Jubiläum "100 Jahre Schlachter-Bibel". Eigenverlag Freie Brüdergemeinde Albstadt, 2005
- Karl-Hermann Kauffmann: Franz Eugen Schlachter, ein Bibelübersetzer im Umfeld der Heiligungsbewegung, Verlag Johannis, Lahr, 2007, ISBN 978-3-501-01568-1
