= Franz Eugen Schlachter =

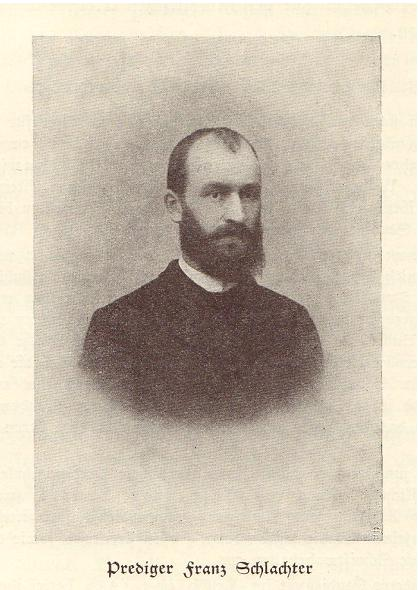
Franz Eugen Schlachter

Franz Eugen Schlachter (28 July 1859 – 12 January 1911) was a revivalist preacher, classical scholar and the translator of the German language Schlachter Bible.

He was the son of Joseph Franz Schlachter, a business man from Mühlhausen/Alsace in France. At the time of his confirmation he visited the assembly (congregation) of Robert Pearsall Smith, the leader of the Holiness Movement, in Basel. At the same time he experienced conversion to Jesus Christ. As his parents lacked money he left school to begin vocational training for a merchant. He continued to study Ancient Greek and Hebrew during this time.

From 1878 to 1882 he studied at a seminary in Basel. In 1882 he began his service as a preacher of the Evangelische Gesellschaft of the Bern canton. In 1884 he was baptised by a preacher from the Freie Evangelische Gemeinde in Thun named Konrad Werndli. In the same year he travelled to Great Britain, to visit the assemblies of Charles Haddon Spurgeon and American evangelist Dwight Lyman Moody.

He wrote many theological and biographical books about, among others, Herodes I (Herod the Great), Resli, a little boy, and Moody. In 1888 he published a short pamphlet named "Brosamen von des Herrn Tisch". In the first part he wrote about the Bible and belief in Jesus Christ. In the second part he wrote about animals and nature. In the third part he described men of God such as Moody and the history of the church. The last part is a report on the political scene in Europe. The pamphlet was distributed to farms in the Emmental.

In 1890 he founded a new assembly in Biel. Subsequently, he began his translation of the Bible, beginning with the book of Job in 1893. In 1905 the Miniaturbibel (Miniature Bible) was completed, named for its size (1 cm thick), small enough to carry in a pocket. The translation was faithful to the Greek and Hebrew transcripts.

In 1907 he went to Bern to join the Freie Evangelische Gemeinde as a pastor.

He was married to Maria, with whom he had four children. In 1911 he died in Bern of a stomach illness.

This article incorporates text from the corresponding German Wikipedia article as of 19 December 2005.

== Literature ==
- R. Kocher: Gott allein die Ehre, Buchhandlung der Evangelischen Gesellschaft, Bern 1931
- Rudolf Dellsperger, Markus Nägeli, Hansueli Ramser: Auf dein Wort, Berchtold Haller Verlag, 1981
- Franz Eugen Schlachter, ein Beitrag zur Geschichte und Theologie der Gemeinschaftsbewegung im Kanton Bern - Akzessarbeit von Walter Wieland, evang. theol. Fakultät der Uni Bern, eingereicht bei Prof. D.A.Lind im Sommer Semester 1982, Edition Neues Leben, Lützelflühstr. Ch 3452 Grünenmatt
- Gottfried Wüthrich: Franz Eugen Schlachter - sein Leben und Wirken, Genf, 16. März 2002 Manuskriptdruck
- Karl-Hermann Kauffmann: Franz Eugen Schlachter und die Heiligungsbewegung, Biographie unter Bezugnahme auf das geistliche Umfeld Schlachters und mit einer kurzen Geschichte der Schlachter Bibel, ausführliche Fassung mit 100 Abbildungen. Gedenkschrift zum Jubiläum "100 Jahre Schlachter-Bibel". Eigenverlag Freie Brüdergemeinde Albstadt, 2005
- „Franz Eugen Schlachter“ Ein Besuch in London, Broschüre, eine Zusammenfassung von drei Artikel aus „den Brosamen von des Herrn Tisch“, Freie Brüdergemeinde Albstadt, 2006
- Karl-Hermann Kauffmann: Franz Eugen Schlachter, ein Bibelübersetzer im Umfeld der Heiligungsbewegung, Verlag Johannis, Lahr, 2007, ISBN 978-3-501-01568-1
- Karl-Hermann Kauffmann (2003). "Schlachter, Franz-Eugen". In Bautz, Traugott (ed.). Biographisch-Bibliographisches Kirchenlexikon (BBKL) (in German). Vol. 21. Nordhausen: Bautz. cols. 1360–1362. ISBN 3-88309-110-3.
