= PCD =

PCD may refer to:

== Businesses and organizations ==
=== Political parties ===
- Democratic Conservative Party, Nicaragua (Spanish: Partido Conservador Demócrata)
- Democratic Society Party, Turkey (Kurdish: Partiya Civaka Demokratîk
- Party of the Democratic Centre (Spain)
- Christian Democratic Party (France) (French: Parti chrétien-démocrate)
- Democratic Convergence Party (São Tomé and Príncipe) (Portuguese: Partido de Convergência Democrática)
- Democratic Center Party of Mexico (Spanish: Partido de Centro Democrático)

=== Other organizations ===
- Personal Communications Devices, a mobile phone development and marketing company
- Partnership for Child Development, an organisation within Imperial College London
- Providence Country Day School, in Rhode Island, United States
- Palestinian Civil Defence, a branch of the Palestinian Security Services

== Science and technology ==
=== Biology and medicine ===
- Paraneoplastic cerebellar degeneration, a paraneoplastic syndrome
- Phlegmasia cerulea dolens, an uncommon severe form of lower extremity deep venous thrombosis
- Primary ciliary dyskinesia, a rare autosomal recessive genetic disorder
- Programmed cell death, the suicide of a cell in a multicellular organism
- Protocatechuate 3,4-dioxygenase, an enzyme
- Post-coital dysphoria

=== Computing and electronics ===
- Personal Computing Device, a specialized laptop or tablet used by an astronaut during a mission
- Proximity coupling device, a reader device for NFC Cards in ISO/IEC 14443
- Photo CD, a system designed by Kodak in 1991
  - Picture CD, a later Kodak product
- Process control daemon, an open-source process controller
- Point Cloud Data, a file format for Point Cloud Library

=== Other uses in science and technology ===
- Polycrystalline diamond, artificial diamond

== Music ==
- The Pussycat Dolls, an American girl group and dance ensemble
  - PCD (album), 2005
- Phillips, Craig and Dean, a contemporary Christian music trio

== Other uses ==
- Picard language, spoken in France and Belgium (ISO 639-3:pcd)
- Pitch circle diameter, a measure of bolt spacing
- Process-centered design, in business
- Progress capture device, in rock climbing
