= CrucialTec =

- Company type: Public (KRX: 114120)
- Industry: Mobile technology
- Founded: April 2001
- Headquarters: Seongnam, South Korea
- Revenue: ▲$208 million
- Net income: ▲$20 million
- Number of employees: 1,200
- Website: www.crucialtec.com

CrucialTec is the world's largest manufacturer of Optical Track Pad (OTP) mobile input devices. Headquartered in Seongnam, South Korea, the company manufactures and supplies OTP devices to handset manufacturers such as Research In Motion, Samsung, LG, HTC, Sony, Motorola, Pantech and ZTE. CrucialTec is also a supplier of devices for smart TVs and digital cameras to companies like HP, Sharp, Kyocera, and Acer. The company developed and commercialized the world's first nano-optic based input device and holds over 200 patents worldwide.

In 2010, CrucialTec had sales of $208 million and is targeting $1 billion in revenues by 2013. In July 2011, CrucialTec opened its Vietnam manufacturing plant in Hanoi with an expected manufacturing capacity of 100 million units per year.

In March 2012, CrucialTec signed a JDA with Swedish biometrics manufacturer Fingerprint Cards AB (FPC) to integrate their swipe sensor into CrucialTec's upcoming Biometric Track Pad (BTP). This led to a three-year supply agreement amendment in November of the same year to produce the BTP which will be assembled in CrucialTec's Korea plants.
