= Fingerprint Cards =

Swedish biometrics company

Fingerprint Cards (FPC)
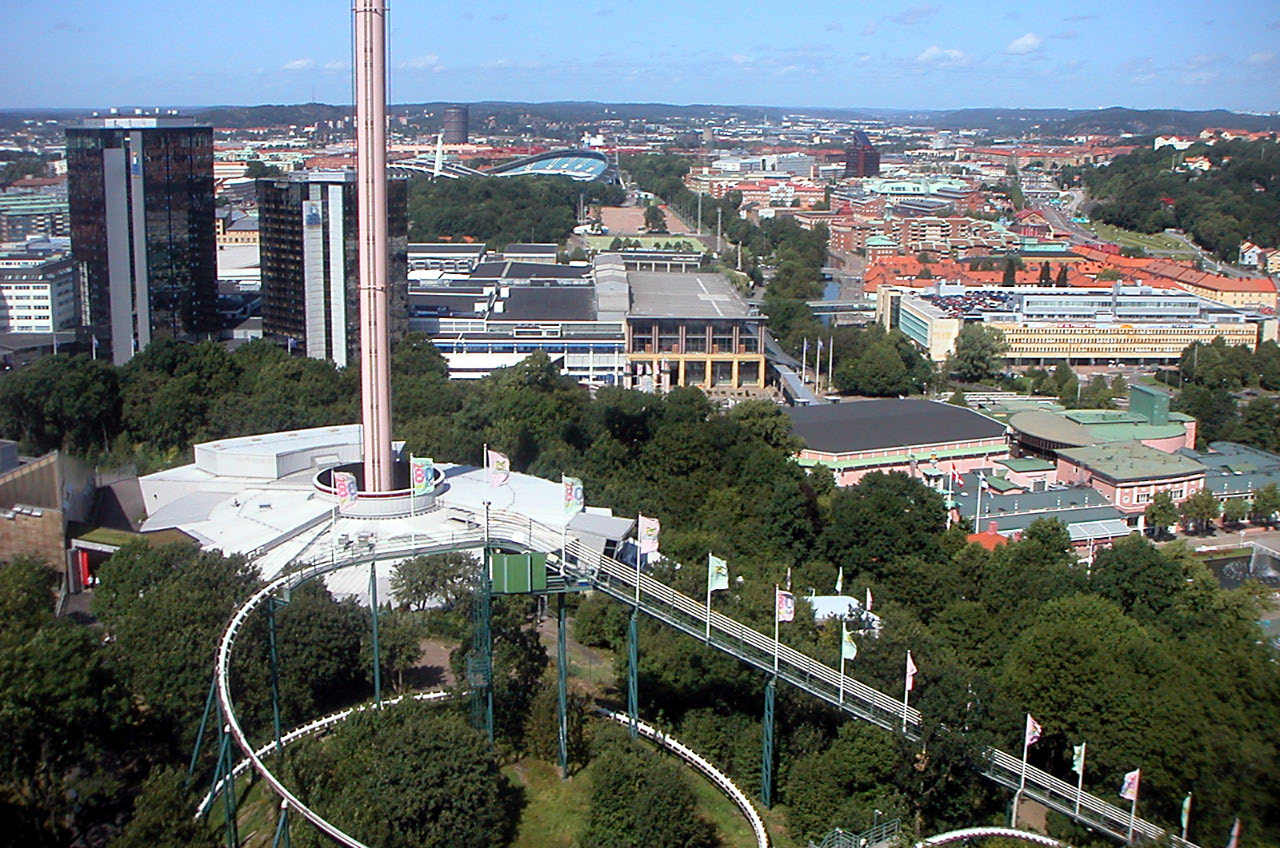
- Aerial view of Gothenburg, where FPC was founded in 1997
- Company type: Public (Aktiebolag)
- Traded as: Nasdaq Stockholm: FING B
- Industry: Technology (Biometrics)
- Founded: 1997
- Founder: Lennart Carlson
- Headquarters: Gothenburg, Sweden
- Area served: Worldwide
- Key people: Johan Carlström; Ted Elvhage; Urban Fagerstedt; Thomas Mikaelsson; Dimitrij Titov; Alexander Kotsinas; Juan Vallejo
- Products: Hardware & Software for Fingerprint sensors
- Revenue: 1,525 million SEK (2018)
- Operating income: -772 million SEK (2018)
- Number of employees: 220 (2018)
- Subsidiaries: AnaCatum Design, Delta ID
- Website: www.fingerprints.com

Fingerprint Cards (FPC) is a Swedish biometrics company that develops and produces biometric systems. FPC was founded in 1997 by Lennart Carlson.

Their products consist of fingerprint sensors, algorithms, packaging technologies and software for biometric recognition.

== History ==
The development of the fingerprint sensor started during the 1980s by Bo Löfberg. He worked to develop a fingerprint sensor during his last years and later patented the technology before he died in 1986. The sensor was only half way finished at the time of his death but the license was sold to Lennart Carlson who later started his company in 1997, Fingerprint Cards. The company went public in 1998, but still did not have a completed product to sell. On the CeBIT fare in 1999 Ericsson Mobile Communications could showcase a prototype accessory for the Ericsson line of mobile phones that was using a licensed sensor and ASIC from FPC. They also managed to secure licensing deals with Motorola and Texas Instruments, the latter developed an authentication platform known as FADT, the Fingerprint Authentication Development tool based on FPC sensors but using Texas Instruments TMS320 rather than the company's own ASICs for algorithmic processing. FPC made large losses in the developing process and investors had to raise 250 million SEK before the company started produce revenue. Lennart Carlson stepped down as CEO in 2009 and Johan Carlström took over the position from 2009 — 2015.

=== 2013 — 2015 ===
FPC's first sensor was launched in 2013. It was compatible with Android and Windows. Johan Carlström resigned in 2015 as CEO because of the ongoing investigation against him and Jörgen Lantto took over the position as CEO in 2015. During 2015, FPC started to generate sales and its stock started to rise. FPC stock price rose from 6 SEK in the beginning of the year 2015, to 118.20 SEK by the end of the year. FPC was a heavily traded stock during 2015.

=== 2015 — present ===
On 3 July 2017, FPC was included on the OMX Stockholm 30 which is the 30 most traded stocks in terms of turnover on the Stockholm stock exchange. FPC was later removed on 2 July 2018.

As the company experienced growing competition, they announced five profit warnings during 2017 and 2018 which caused the stock price to plummet. At its peak, FPC had a market value of 42.7 billion SEK compared to its current market value of 4.2 billion SEK as of May 2019. In July 2018, the company said that conditions were challenging and that it expected the demand for fingerprint sensors to continue to decline. FPC has since worked on diversifying its business with iris recognition and smartcards.

In 2016, Jörgen Lantto was replaced as CEO by Christian Fredrikson, who is the former CEO of FPC. On 21 March 2017, FPC's stock fell 40% after a profit warning. Since then, the stock has continued on a downward trend with constantly declining profits in their annual reports. In the middle of 2018, the stock price was at a low of 6 SEK, the stock has since recovered and is trading at around 13 SEK as of April 2019. Revenue in 2016 was 6638 million SEK, 2966 million SEK in 2017 and 1535 million SEK in 2018.

== Customers & Partnerships ==
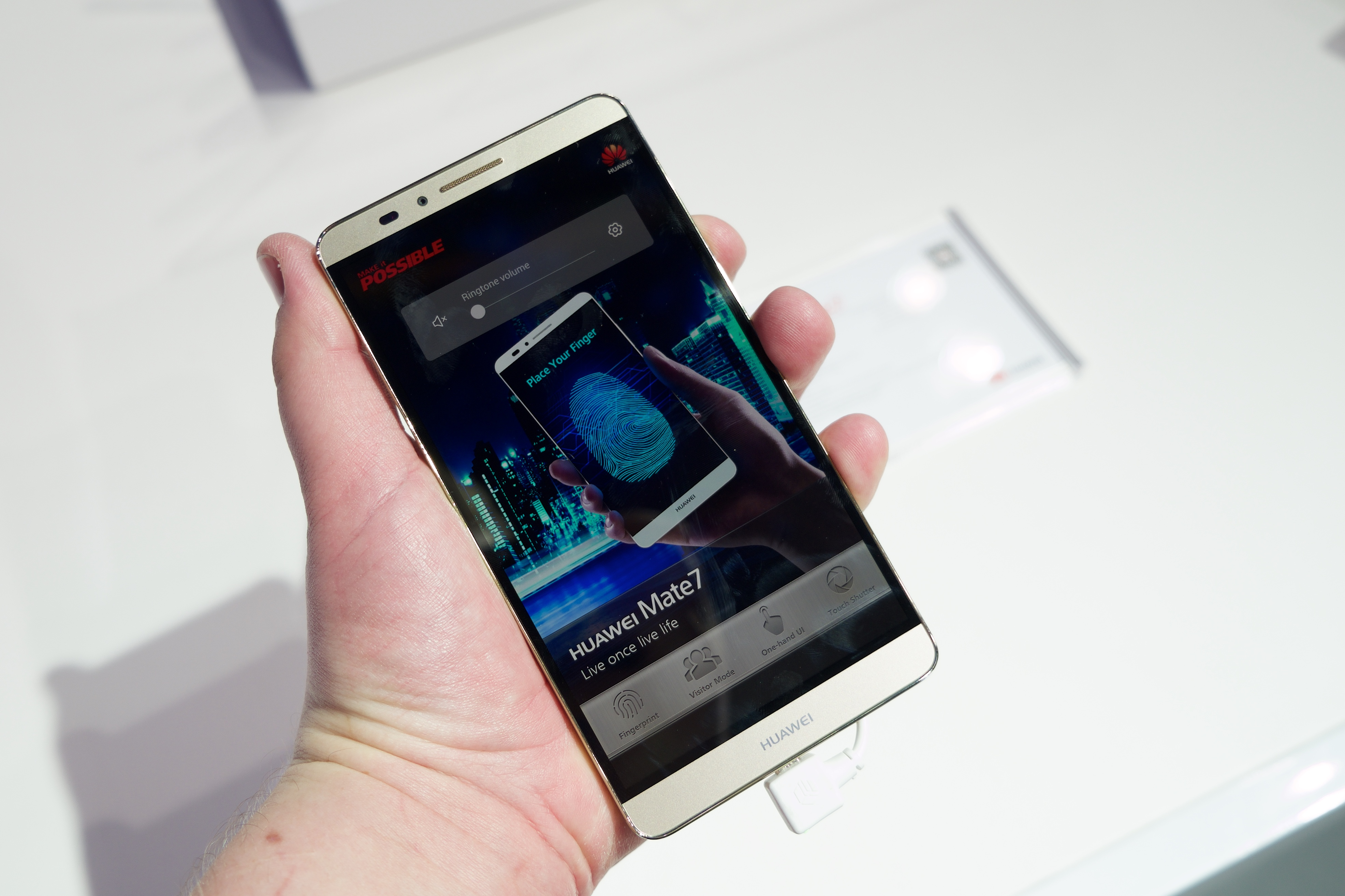
Huawei Mate 7, featuring FPC's FPC1020 sensor

=== Customers ===
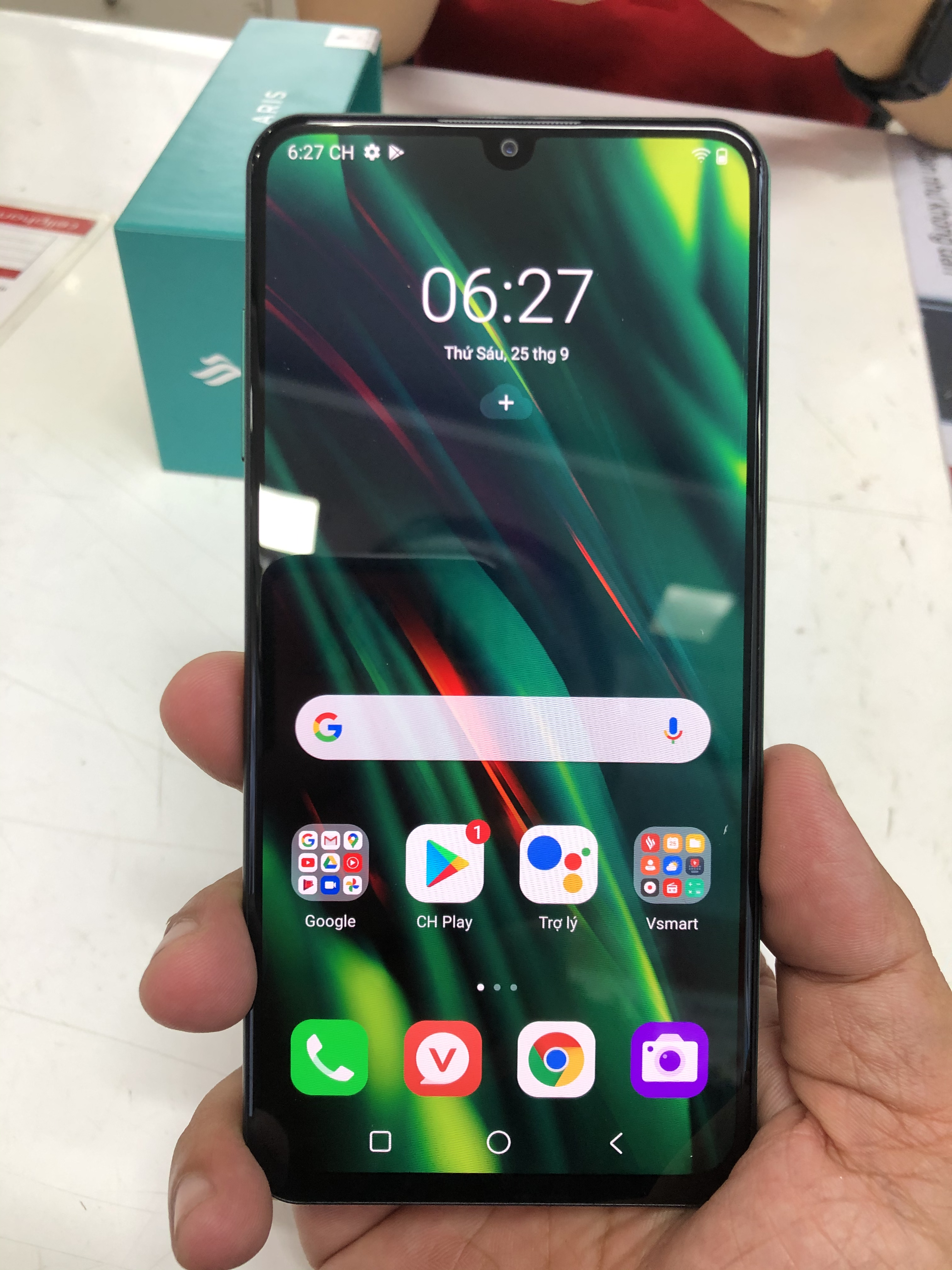
Vsmart Aris - Vietnamese smartphone with FPC1540 sensor

FPC's sensors are mainly used in smartphones and since its first inclusion in the Android phone in 2014, over 330 different phone models feature FPC's technology. FPC has sold over a billion sensors since its first commercial sensor in 2013. Some of the most recognisable companies that use FPC's technology include; Google, Huawei, Oppo and BlackBerry. FPC's sensor, FPC1025, was chosen by Google for their first Pixel smartphone. The newest Pixel also include an FPC sensor (FPC1035) which was released on 8 May 2019.

Huawei have been using FPC's product in their smartphones since 2015. Some of their models with FPC technology include their new phones; Nova 3e and Enjoy 8. Vsmart Aris and Vsmart Aris Pro also have launched, integrating the side-mounted sensor FPC1540 by FPC.

=== Partnerships ===
FPC is working together with Precise Biometrics, STMicroelectronics and Gemalto to replace Username/Password applications. FPC and its partners are working on the development of a smartwatch which will embed a fingerprint sensor from FPC. Precise Biometrics provides the algorithm for fingerprint recognition and STMicroelectronics will supply the semiconductor.

FPC is also working together with Gemalto to introduce fingerprint scanners into credit cards (Smart card). The digital security firm Gemalto has selected FPC technology for the next generations dual interface payment cards. The payment cards will use FPC with flexible T-shape sensors with an ultra-low power consumption. The current order consists of a few hundred thousands of the T-shape sensor which will be delivered through 2019 and 2020.

== Subsidiaries ==
FPC has acquired two companies since it was founded in 1997. The first acquisition was made in 2014 when they acquired AnaCatum Design. The second acquisition was the California-based company Delta ID in 2017.

=== AnaCatum Design ===
In 2014, FPC acquired AnaCatum Design AB for an undisclosed amount. AnaCatum is a Swedish-based company from Linköping, founded in 2009. AnaCatum Design AB specialises in technology licensing and ASIC development. Shortly after the acquisition in 2014, AnaCatum and FPC announced a new fingerprint sensor, the FPC1150. The FPC1150 was the world's first touch fingerprint sensor that could be mounted on the front side of Android smartphones. The development of the FPC1150 was possible through cooperation with AnaCatum Design. The new sensor was half the size of the previous sensor (FPC1020), allowing it to be mounted in the home button of mobile devices. This had never been possible before due to size constraints. Previous sensors that the company had developed could only be mounted on the backside of smartphones.

=== Delta ID ===
In 2017, FPC acquired Delta ID. Delta ID was founded in 2011 and based in California. Delta ID was acquired by FPC for US$106 million. Delta ID develops biometric authentication based on iris recognition for smartphones, PC, tablets and vehicles. Since the acquisition, many of the officials in Delta ID has decided to leave the company. In January 2018, Vice President (Vivek Khandelwal) left Delta ID and started working for another company. Sales manager, Dillon Xiao and CFO, Hue Harguindeguy, has also left their positions at Delta ID since the acquisition.

== Hardware & Software ==
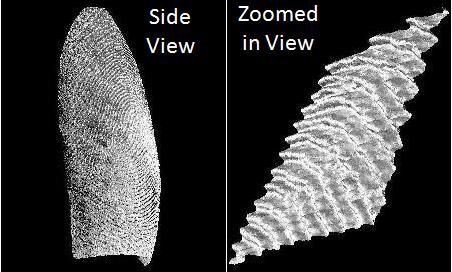
3D fingerprint

FPC manufacture different sensors which uses different technology for fingerprint recognition. These technologies include;

- Touch based
- Swipe based
- Area based

FPC touch based sensors works on capacitive sensor principle. Capacitive fingerprint sensors use electric current to image the ridges and valleys in a fingerprint. The swipe fingerprint sensor uses 3D sensing technology to image a high-resolution 3D picture of the fingerprint. Rolling or pressing the finger against a sensor can cause inconsistencies because the skin deforms when being pressed against the sensor. 3D touch-less fingerprint scanners can overcome these problems for a faster and more consistent authentication. The area-based fingerprint sensor works by reflecting light to capture an image of the fingerprint.

Since 2017, FPC has also been working on face and iris recognition.

=== Products ===
Some of their products include; FPC touch sensor series, FPC1200-series, FPC1300-series. The products small size and low energy consumption allow the technology to be implemented into small products such as smartcards and smartphones. FPC is currently listed on Nasdaq OMX large cap.

== Competitors ==
Due to the technological advancement and increased interest in biometric solutions during the 2010s, competition has grown in the fingerprint sensor market. FPC's market share has decreased in the past years as a number of new companies created new competition. As of 2019, The top players of the global fingerprint sensor market are.

Company name	Founded	Based
Apple Inc.	1976	USA
Synaptics	1986	USA
Precise Biometrics	1997	Sweden
IDEX	1996	Norway
Next Biometrics	2000	Norway
Anviz Global	2001	USA
IDEMIA	2007	France

== Criticism and Controversies ==
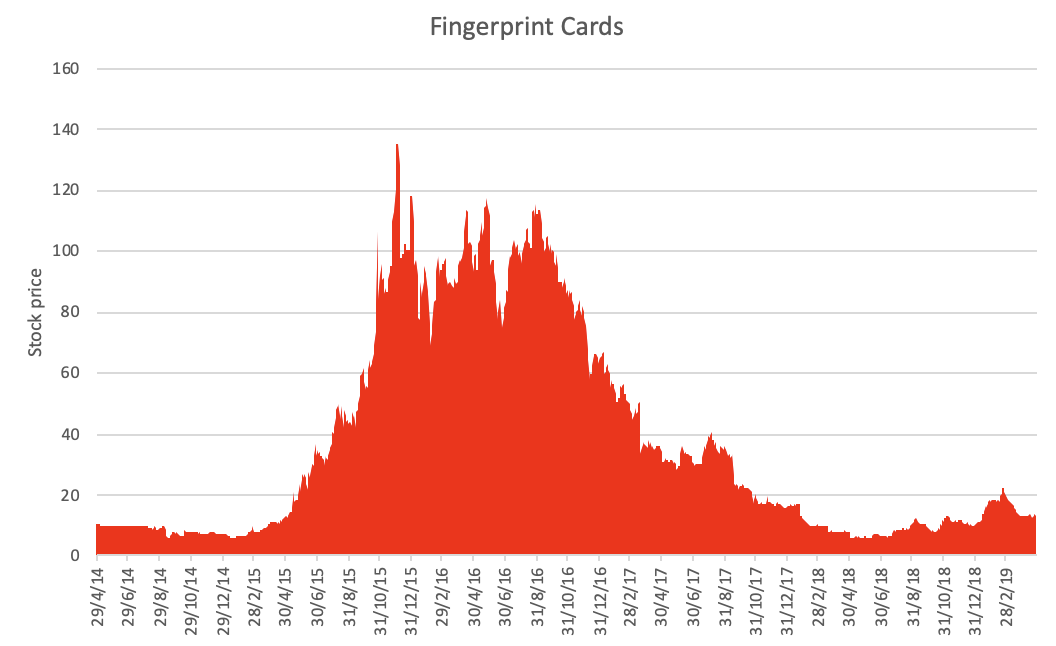
FPC; Daily closing prices between April 2014 - April 2019

=== 2012 ===
FPC reported suspicious movement in stock prices before important events and interim reports during 2010–2012. In 2012, two non-executive employees at FPC got arrested on the suspicion of insider trading. One of the arrests, Tord Wingren, resulted in a 1-year and 6 months in prison by the district court. This sentence was later eased in the court of appeal. Tord Wingren was released on probation with 200 hours of community service, a 5-year ban on business/trading activity and obligated to pay back the 1.6 million SEK he benefitted from the insider trading in FPC. During the same incident, Anders Hultqvist who is a past board member, was also sentenced to 1 year and 6 months in prison by the district court. Anders Hultqvist also got his sentence eased by the court of appeal. Anders Hultqvist got a 1-year and 2 months prison sentence, a 5-year ban on any business related activity and ordered to pay back the 200,000 SEK profit made from the insider trading in FPC.

=== 2013 ===
In 2013, a fraudulent website was made by an unknown person. The website announced fake documents and press releases about FPC being purchased for 4.2 billion SEK while the actual value of the company was about half of that during the time. The press releases announced that Samsung was going to use FPC technology and had decided to acquire the company. This caused the market value of FPC to increase with 1.5 billion SEK (+50% in stock value) before the stock was trade stopped. The investigation did not lead to any arrest and was later dropped in 2015. Both Samsung and FPC denied to have been in contact with each other and confirm that the press releases were fake.

=== 2014 ===
In 2014, FPC's office got raided again. The CEO, Johan Carlström, and one other board member were suspected for insider trading. The Swedish Economic Crime Authority stated that the investigation against Johan Carlström had been ongoing for nearly a year and concerned several different insider trades. Johan Carlström allegedly traded stocks multiple times before important event in the company. Johan Carlström later decided to step down as CEO and resign from the board in 2015.

=== 2017 ===
In 2017, board member Lars Söderfjell and equity owner Johan Carlström were arrested again for insider trading. Finansinspektionen (Swedish Financial Supervisory Authority), which monitors all companies that are operating in Swedish financial markets, started to investigate FPC after a large amount of stocks had been sold before a profit warning in 2016. The profit warning was announced on 8 December 2016 and Finansinspektionen began their investigation on 12 December 2016. Söderfjell has since the incident been released from custody and denied the allegations. The trial against Johan Carlström has been postponed multiple times since he was first arrested. The trial is currently scheduled to take place during spring of 2020.
