= Ericsson Mobile Platforms =

Ericsson Mobile Platforms AB
- Type: Subsidiary
- Industry: Wireless Semiconductors
- Predecessor: Ericsson Mobile Communications
- Founded: 1 October 2001; 24 years ago
- Defunct: 2009
- Fate: Dissolved
- Successor: ST-Ericsson
- Headquarters: Lund, Sweden
- Key people: Tord Wingren, Sandeep Chennakeshu, Robert Puskaric
- Number of employees: 2,100 (as of 2009)
- Parent: Ericsson

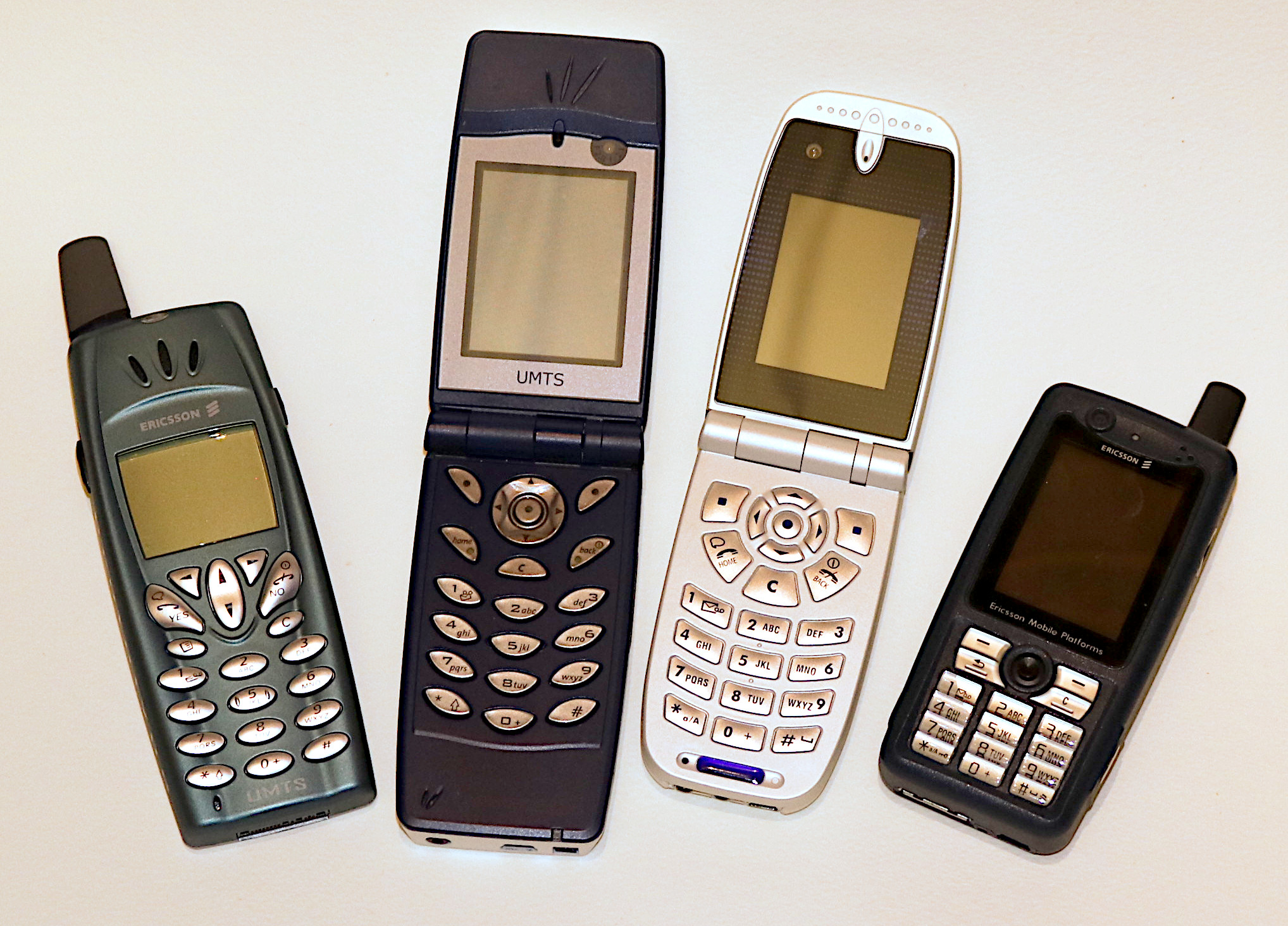
Prototypes from Ericsson Mobile Platforms: Wallentina, Wakaba, Futaba, S335

Ericsson Mobile Platforms AB (EMP) was the name of a company within the Ericsson group that supplied mobile platforms, i.e. the technological basis on which a cellular phone product can be built. The main office was in Lund, Sweden.

EMP was one of the leading suppliers of 3G technology to various brands of phones. EMP did not manufacture chips themselves, but partnered with manufacturers that made them based on their reference design and Intellectual Property Rights. It was thus a fabless company. These chips were then only sold to EMP customers. According to the company, EMP held the world’s largest 2G, 2.5G and 3G IPR portfolio, with more than 20,000 granted patents worldwide.

== History ==
Due to the European telecom crisis in the beginning of the 2000s, Ericsson Mobile Communications became unprofitable, and was split in two parts: one part was merged with the mobile division of Sony and formed Sony Ericsson, aimed at developing mobile terminals for the consumer market.

At the same time, the other part of Ericsson Mobile Communications formed Ericsson Mobile Platforms. Some of their customers were Flextronics, HTC, LG Electronics, NEC, Sagem, Sharp, Amoi and of course Sony Ericsson. The main focus of the company was around the development of a mobile platform for the third generation of mobile telephony, UMTS.

At the end of 2004 Ericsson Technology Licensing was de-established, and select parts of that company was folded into Ericsson Mobile Platforms.

October 3, 2008 the company showcased a handheld prototype for LTE (fourth generation mobile telephony). At this time, the company stated that they estimated to have the technology available for the market around the year 2011.

The company existed for 8 years, but February 12, 2009 Ericsson announced that Ericsson Mobile Platforms would be merged with the mobile platform company of STMicroelectronics, ST-NXP Wireless, to create a 50/50 joint venture owned by Ericsson and STMicroelectronics called ST-Ericsson. This joint venture collapsed in 2013 and remaining activities can be found in Ericsson Modems and STMicroelectronics. Ericsson Mobile Platform disappeared as a legal entity early 2009.

== Platforms ==
The company took over the internal platforms that had been developed in Ericsson Mobile Communications under names such as Sandra, Jane etc., and developed a series of platforms tied to certain specific radio standards:

| Platform | Introduced | Architecture | Radio type | Used in | Ref |
|---|---|---|---|---|---|
| G100 | ? | A0 | GSM/GPRS | | |
| G200 "Cobalt" | ? | A1 | GSM/GPRS | | |
| G250 | ? | A1 | GSM/GPRS | | |
| G300 "Cerium" | ? | A1 | GSM/GPRS | | |
| E100 "Copper" | ? | A1 | EDGE+GSM/GPRS | | |
| E150 | ? | A1 | EDGE | | |
| E200 | 2005 | A1 | EDGE+GSM/GPRS | | |
| U100 "Platinum" | 2002 | A1 | UMTS | Sony Ericsson Z1010 | |
| U250 | ? | A1 | UMTS | Sony Ericsson K800 | |
| U300 | 2006 | A2 | UMTS, EDGE, GSM/GPRS | | |
| U350/U360 | ? | A2 | HSDPA, UMTS, EDGE, GSM/GPRS | Sony Ericsson Z750 | |

Open Platform API or "OPA" is the name given to the platform used across Sony Ericsson phones in Europe.

== The third generation (3G) ==
In 2001, Ericsson Mobile Platforms became one of the first companies to license 3G technology platforms to mobile phone manufacturers. EMP was the first platform provider to have commercially launched handsets containing their WCDMA, EDGE and GPRS technologies.

By 2006, manufacturers such as Sony Ericsson Mobile Communications, Amoi, Sagem, Sharp, LG, Samsung, and NEC, had signed licence agreements with EMP.

For 2006 Ericsson Mobile Platforms started deliveries of the U350 and U360 platforms, which was the smallest HSDPA/EDGE platforms yet. U350 is a quad-band EDGE and single-band HSDPA platform, whereas the U360 adds triple-band HSDPA capabilities.

== See also ==
- Sony Ericsson
- ST-Ericsson
- Mobile platform

== Sources ==
- Ericsson, TI to Develop 3G Solutions for Handset Manufacturers
- Recipe for making a mobile phone
- Ericsson Launches Smallest HSDPA / EDGE Mobile Platforms
- Ericsson Upgrades Its Mobile Platforms
- Smallest HSDPA/EDGE Mobile Platforms from Ericsson
