= Pantech W62PT =

3G flip phone

Kantan Keitai W62PT
- Brand: au
- Manufacturer: Pantech (Pantech Wireless Japan)
- Series: Kantan Keitai
- First released: August 30, 2008
- Discontinued: March 31, 2022
- Compatible networks: CDMA 1X WIN (CDMA2000 1xEV-DO Rel.0)
- Form factor: Clamshell
- Colors: Silver; Gold; Pink
- Dimensions: 100 mm (3.9 in) H 50 mm (2.0 in) W 16.9 mm (0.67 in) D
- Weight: 124 g (4.4 oz)
- Operating system: REX OS + KCP
- CPU: Qualcomm MSM6550 @ 225 MHz
- Storage: Approx. 100 MB
- Removable storage: microSD
- SIM: au IC card
- Rear camera: 1.31 MP CMOS
- Front camera: None
- Display: Main: 2.6 in (66 mm) TFT LCD, 240×320 pixels (QVGA), 260,000 colors Sub: 1.2 in (30 mm) TFT LCD, 128×128 pixels, single color
- Model: W62PT
- Made in: South Korea

The Kantan Keitai W62PT is a mobile phone developed by South Korea's Pantech (imported and distributed by Pantech Wireless Japan) for KDDI and Okinawa Cellular Telephone under the au brand on the CDMA 1X WIN (later au 3G) network. It is a model in the operator's "Kantan Keitai" (simple mobile phone) series.

== Features ==
Following the W61PT and released on August 30, 2008, this handset was the first adoption for the "Kantan Keitai" series on the 1X WIN network since Kyocera's "W32K". It was the first in the series to support the au IC card and external media (microSD cards). However, despite being a 1X WIN series phone, it did not support "LISMO Music" services such as EZ "Chaku-Uta Full" and "LISMO Video Clips", nor did it support "Jibun Tsucho", the dedicated management application for Jibun Bank.

In terms of functionality, it was designed with senior citizens—the target demographic for the Kantan Keitai line—in mind. In addition to "Hikari de Sōsa Navi" (Light Operation Navigation), which prompts operations by illuminating keys, it features eight "Deka" (large) functions: "Deka Keys" using the high-visibility Frutiger font on alphanumeric keys, "Deka Characters" capable of displaying text up to 40 points, "Deka pictograms", "Deka Clock", "Deka Lamp", "Deka Earpiece Volume", "Deka Ringtone", and a "Deka Strap Hole" for easy strap attachment. During calls, the "Hakkiri Onsei" (Clear Voice) feature clarifies the caller's voice, and text-to-speech reading for email messages and menus is supported.

On the exterior, the black square sub-display on the rear casing is distinctive. Various information, such as a two-line digital clock, is displayed toward the center-right of this screen.

== History ==
- June 3, 2008: Officially announced by KDDI and Pantech Wireless Japan.
- August 30, 2008: Released nationwide simultaneously.
- April 9, 2009: Software update (Keitai Update) initiated to resolve software issues.
- January 1, 2010: Offered as a handset for CDMA Prepaid service, replacing the W63K.
- March 31, 2010: Postpaid sales discontinued.
- September 30, 2010: Prepaid sales discontinued, except in Okinawa.
- March 31, 2018: EZweb, EZ App (B), and select services terminated.
- March 31, 2022: CDMA 1X WIN (au 3G) service completely shutdown, rendering the device inoperable.
