= Tord Wingren =

Swedish inventor, entrepreneur, and scientist

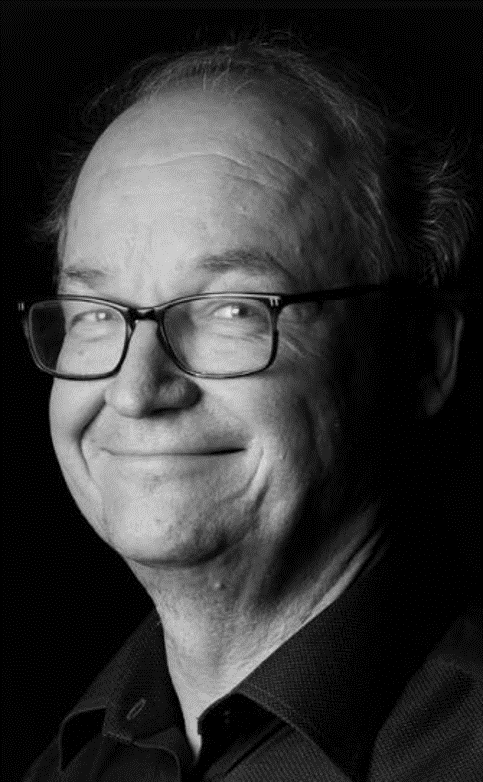
- Born: January 31, 1961 (age 65); Helsingborg
- Education: Lund University

Tord Wingren is a Swedish inventor, entrepreneur, and scientist and holder of 28 patents relating to Wireless communication, technology, and the implications of light on the human body. He developed Bluetooth technology while working with Ericsson Mobile Communications, and is the co-founder of several technology companies including BrainLit, Watersprint, and Modcam AB.

== Early life and career ==
Wingren was born in Helsingborg, Sweden on January 31, 1961, to Ulla Nilsson (maiden name: Frid), a social worker for the city of Helsingborg, Sweden, and Bo Nilsson, assistant professor in Physics and Mathematics at Norrlyckeskolan, in Ödåkra. Tord Wingren is related to Janne Nilsson, a former minister of defense and member of Parliament in Sweden, who was his grandfather's brother in law on his father's side of the family.

He attended Lund University graduating in 1985 with a Master of Science in Electrical Engineering. His master's thesis Pioneering Applied Mathematics with an Industrial Application focused on effectivizing the trimming of filters in production, and was instrumental in substantially improving the production of filter components based on electronic circuits in the telecom industry.

Wingren has worked with Ericsson Mobile Platforms and was a member of the technology team which invented Bluetooth, originally known as short link radio technology. The development of Bluetooth technology was launched by Nils Rydbeck, the chief technology officer of Ericsson Mobile and Swedish physician and inventor Johan Ullman in Lund, Sweden in 1989, with the concept of analog wireless headsets. Wingren wrote the first technical specifications in 1994 for the initial Bluetooth technology called Multi Communicator Link, with Sven Mattisson and Jaap Haartsen as main architects and designers.

Wingren was initially hired by Ericsson in 1985 as an engineer for high frequency modeling and characterisation and became a Radio Silicon Designer in 1987, a position he held through 1991 when he was promoted to Vice President Research and Development for Mobile Phones. In 1987, Wingren pioneered the first radio chip designs for GSM in the P8S silicon design process for integrated circuits for RIFA AB. RIFA AB was a Swedish electronics manufacturer of resistors and capacitors, which was established in 1942. During World War II, RIFA manufactured parts for the Swedish radio industry. In 1947, it became incorporated into Telefonaktiebolaget LM Ericsson. Wingren's first patented invention was an electronic integrated circuit for boosting fluorescent lamps when he was 25 years old when working at RIFA AB.

Wingren served as managing director at Samsung in London from March 2003 through June 2006 and headed mobile phone technology and business development. He served as vice president and Site Manager for Huawei from 2012 to 2017, based in Lund, Sweden which innovated handset 4G modem technology.

He co-founded Modcam with Bogdan Tudosoiu, Jan Erik Solem, and Karl-Anders Johansson in 2013. The company, which develops hardware and software solutions to make cameras smarter, was acquired by Cisco in July 2020. Wingren, Ola Hansson, Kenneth Persson and Lars Montelius founded Watersprint in 2013, a company specializing in disinfecting water in a sustainable way. A majority of the company shares was sold to Sandberg Development in 2023.

In 2004, he served as co-founder with Pär Bergsten of Nanoradio AB, becoming the CEO from 2008 to 2012. The company was later sold to Samsung. Wingren co-founded Digital Imaging Systems with Roland Pudelko in 2006 and served as Executive Vice President and Chief Technology Officer through June 2008.

== Patents ==
Wingren is the inventor or co-inventor of more than 30 patents, including several relating to Bluetooth technology such as a method and apparatus in a mobile communications network which involve detecting and/or preventing the use of radio communication equipment in situations or places in which such use is undesirable.

Wingren also holds patents for a head worn electronic device which fits around the eyes of the user adjust light based on the user's sensitivity and brain characteristics; a light control system consisting of a series of light sources which are configured to illuminate a space, a sensor that detects a person or animal, and a control panel that controls the amount of light; a foundational patent to generate light recipes based on individualized data and a light exposure monitoring system that ties together multiple sources and includes sensor to monitor and record data and detects.

== Publications ==
- Application of Deep Learning Method in Bluetooth Security: Master's Thesis of Seyi Sunkanmi Oyinlola, University of Eastern Finland, April 2021.
- Analysis for Science, Engineering and Beyond Workshop 2008
- How to Minimize Effects of Seasonal Affective Disorder (SAD)
- Sweden's Telecommunications Industry
- Vision (in Swedish)
- Power amplifier for ultra high frequency using conventional silicon NMOS IC technology
- The Mobile Handset Evolving
- How to become the Leader in the Mobile Telecom Industry
- Born Global
