= Pantech Wireless =

North American subsidiary of Pantech

- Type: Private
- Industry: Wireless
- Founded: 2002
- Headquarters: Atlanta, Georgia, United States
- Key people: Beyong-Yeop Park: Founder, CEO; Charles Park: CEO, NAM; Wyatt Whaley: Vice President, Product Planning, NAM
- Website: www.pantechusa.com

Pantech Wireless, Inc. (PWI), formed in 2002, is the North American subsidiary of Pantech, one of Korea’s three largest mobile phone manufacturers.

== Background ==
PWI has created Wireless products for major North American carriers including AT&T, Verizon Wireless, Sprint Nextel and Virgin Mobile.

Benchmark handsets created by PWI for the North American market include the popular line of dual-sliding, double-keyboard devices such as the Pantech duo, Matrix, and Pantech Matrix Pro smartphone. PWI also manufactures Slate, “world’s thinnest phone with a QWERTY keyboard,” and C3b, “the world’s smallest camera flip-phone.” Additionally, PWI created the Breeze, a handset that utilizes the principles of Universal Design, which are a set of guidelines that ensure consumer electronics products are of optimal ease of use for customers of all ages, and those with disabilities.

== Products North America ==
Product Name	Date	Carrier
Hero	May 2006	Helio
DM-P100	Apr., 2006	Disney Mobile
C300	Jun., 2006	AT&T
PN-218	Aug., 2006	Alltel Wireless
C120	Oct., 2006	AT&T
C3	Nov., 2006	AT&T
Ocean	Feb., 2007	Helio
C3b	May, 2007	AT&T
DM-P205	May, 2007	Disney Mobile
C150	Jul., 2007	AT&T
Pantech duo	Oct., 2007	AT&T
Pantech duo (red)	Feb., 2008	AT&T
Breeze	May, 2008	AT&T
C610	Oct., 2008	AT&T
Matrix	Oct., 2008	AT&T
Slate	Oct., 2008	AT&T
C630	Dec., 2008	AT&T
Ocean 2	Feb., 2009	Virgin Mobile
Matrix PRO	Feb., 2009	AT&T
Breeze (black)	Feb., 2009	AT&T
Link	Apr., 2010	AT&T
Breeze II	May, 2010	AT&T
Pursuit	Jun., 2010	AT&T
Ease	Jun., 2010	AT&T
Laser	Oct., 2010	AT&T
Crossover	Jun., 2011	AT&T
Breeze III	Jul., 2011	AT&T
Pursuit II	Jul., 2011	AT&T

== Pantech Company Timeline ==
- 1991: Established Pantech Co., Ltd
- 2002: Established Pantech Wireless, Inc. (PWI) in North America
- 2003: Formed a J/V – Dalian Daxian Pantech Communications Co, Ltd in Dalian, China
- 2003: Company begins developing Pantech branded products
- 2004: Pantech debuts first GSM handset with fingerprint recognition
- 2005: Acquired SK Teletech owning SKY brand, the most upscale premium brand in Korea
- 2005: First entered Japan market among Korean handset makers delivering 1st model to KDDI
- 2006: First PWI branded device, PN-218, offered through Alltell
- 2006: PWI launches C300, “world’s smallest camera flip phone,” with AT&T
- 2006: PWI manufacturers Ocean, first dual-sliding, double keyboard handset, created for Helio
- 2008: Slate, “world’s thinnest phone with a QWERTY keyboard,” created for AT&T
- 2009: Launched Breeze, an easy-to-use and “top performing” handset for AT&T
- 2009: Launched ‘Matrix Pro’, a dual sliding smart phone for AT&T
- 2010: Launched Impact, Pantech's first haptic, dual key-board 3G Quick Messaging phone for AT&T
- 2010: Launched Reveal, a slider with simultaneous numeric and QWERTY keypad 3G Quick Messaging phone for AT&T
- 2010: Link, Pantech's ultra-slim and sleek messaging phone launches at AT&T
- 2010: Launched Breeze II, the successor to the Breeze, easy-to-use handset for AT&T
- 2010: Pursuit launches for AT&T as Pantech's first phone with touchscreen
- 2010: Launched Pantech Ease, the first simplicity-centric phone for AT&T with keyboard and touchscreen
- 2010: Laser, AT&T's thinnest phone with sliding keyboard, is launched
- 2011: Crossover, Pantech's first Android smartphone in the U.S., is launched
- 2011: 20th Anniversary of Pantech Wireless, Inc., U.S.-based subsidiary of Pantech Group
- 2011: Pantech announces exclusive handset sponsorship of Dew Tour
- 2011: Pantech announces sponsorship of Dew Tour Pro Athletes, Bucky Lasek, Brett Banasiewicz, Greg Lutzka, Ryan Devenzo
- 2011: Inaugural Pantech Open in Ocean City, MD for Dew Tour Action Sports Competition

== Awards ==
- 1995: Pantech creates the world’s first CDMA product
- 2005: Pantech honored with the Best Mobile Phone Application distinction at the Asian Mobile News Award
- 2005, 2006, 2007: Pantech receives seven iF Design awards and four red dot Design awards for excellence and innovation in mobile phone design
- 2007: Pantech’s IM-U200 (Korean market) awarded ‘Best of Innovation’ at CES International
