= Ericsson Radio Systems =

Ericsson AB Ericsson Radio Systems AB (ERA)
- Company type: Subsidiary, Aktiebolag
- Industry: Mobile phones, base stations, telephone exchanges
- Predecessor: Svenska Radioaktiebolaget
- Founded: 1 January 1983
- Headquarters: Stockholm, Sweden
- Key people: Nils Hörjel, Åke Lundqvist, Lars Ramqvist, Nils Rydbeck, Kurt Hellström
- Parent: Ericsson
- Subsidiaries: Ericsson Mobile Communications

Ericsson Radio Systems AB was the name of a wholly owned subsidiary in the Ericsson sphere, founded on 1 January 1983 by buying out all former owners of Svenska Radioaktiebolaget (SRA). The company was well known in Scandinavia and elsewhere in the 1980s, as it was deploying NMT systems and developing a line of mobile telephones under the brand name Hotline. In 2002 the subsidiary changed its name to simply Ericsson AB and absorbed 19 other legal entities in the Ericsson sphere, but kept its company registration number with the Swedish state, so it is still the same legal entity as Ericsson Radio Systems. The merge of the smaller legal entities was done to cut down operating costs. The main activity within Ericsson AB is infrastructure for mobile telephony.

== History ==
1 January 1983, the company became a wholly owned subsidiary under the name Ericsson Radio Systems AB. This year the company had 3998 employees and described its business as advanced wireless communications for civilian use. The company was organized in the following areas:

- Mobile telephony, which also becomes the most expansive part of the business from 1983 and forward.
- Mobile radio, in 1983 roughly 30% of the billing with products like police radio systems and radiotelephones for taxis. By the mid 1980s this business goes stagnant.
- Pagers, in cooperation with the Dutch subsidiary NIRA.
- Microwave communications, especially dealing with a government-backed project called Tele-X. This area changed its name to Radiotransmission in 1984 and was transferred to Ericssons business unit for defense products in the end of 1985.

29 October 1983, the company created The Ericsson Mobile Telephone Laboratory in the science park Ideon in Lund, Sweden, and all research and development of mobile telephones was transferred there. The former development site for mobile phones in Gävle, tracing its roots back to Sonab mobiltelefon AB and as far back as AGA mobilradio was decommissioned, and none of the original developers accepted the offer to transfer to Lund. The mobile telephone factories in Gävle and Kumla remained. The reason for the move was that the company wanted to increase the cooperation with Faculty of Engineering (LTH), Lund University. The decision for this strategic movement is claimed to have been taken at a dinner hosted by Thure Gabriel Gyllenkrok, a board member of Svenska Radioaktiebolaget, at the castle Björnstorp on 11 October 1982.

Also in 1983, the Swedish company Magnetic, a manufacturer of mobile telephony base stations was acquired.

=== The restructuring of 1986 ===
1 March 1986, Nils Rydbeck was appointed manager of research and development of mobile telephones in Lund, coming from a former assignment of developing a combat-net radio. After this he quickly presented a 10-year plan for development of a series of mobile telephones to Åke Lundkvist. The business area for mobile telephone was restructured the following year into tow separate business areas with Lundkvist as CEO and Ulf Johansson as assisting CEO:

- Systems including base stations and similar products reporting to Håkan Jansson. This area was controlled from the office in Stockholm, where Ericsson moved to world leadership by fusing the AXE telephone exchange with base stations for both NMT, ETACS and AMPS. The coming year, Ericsson controlled 30% of the world market for mobile telephone systems, and worked actively with the specification of GSM.
- Terminals, i.e. mobile phones, reporting to Flemming Örneholm. This area was entirely controlled from Lund and from the former employees in Stockholm only two people moved along to Lund: Flemming himself and sales manager Kjell Johanson. The terminal products were at this time pieces with a weight around a few kilograms and intended to be mounted in cars and powered by the electrical system of the car. During 1986, around 10,000 terminals of this type were manufactured. The main competitors were Motorola and Nokia (at this time under the brand name Mobira).

=== Further structural development ===
1 October 1988, Lars Ramqvist replaced Åke Lundkvist as CEO, and Ericsson's business area for defence communications was folded into the company.

On 1 July 1989 a new joint venture company was formed together with General Electric under the name Ericsson GE Mobile Communications. The company consisted of all mobile phone activity of both companies in Sweden and USA. Ericsson owned 60% of the company, and General Electric owned 40%. In this fusion GE contributed, among other things, a factory of some 1,600 employees in Lynchburg, Virginia. Ericsson Radio Systems former CEO Åke Lundqvist moved to the US as CEO for the new company, which also controlled the mobile handset activities in Kumla and the research facility in Lund.

In the annual report for 1989, the activities of Ericsson Radio Systems are described as divided into the following areas (the percentage is specified as the ratio of the total billing of 1989):

- Mobile telephony systems (56%), which was claimed to constitute 40% of the world market for such systems in 1988.
- Mobile telephones (14%)
- Mobile radio (15%)
- Mobile data systems (1%)
- Pagers (7%), including a Dutch branch office which at this point also ventures into wireless office telephony, DECT.
- Defence communications (7%)

In 1990 Ericsson GE Mobile Communications, at the initiative of Åke Lundkvist, opened a new office for research and development in Research Triangle Park, a science park in Raleigh, North Carolina. This year, Kurt Hellström assumed the role of CEO of Ericsson Radio Systems, as Lars Ramqvist was promoted to CEO of the Ericsson main company. The purpose of this initiative was to divide research and development from pure manufacturing, to mirror the split between Kumla and Lund in Sweden.

The activity in Ericsson GE Mobile Communications was characterized by severe cooperation problems between the two companies, and inability to break into the U.S. market for mobile phones. In the beginning of 1992 Ericsson purchased another 20% of the joint venture and Ericsson GE Mobile Communications was owned to 80% by Ericsson. At the end of 1993 General Electric left the board for the joint venture. In 1994, it was renamed Ericsson Mobile Communications and eventually, on 1 April 1998, General Electric used a bail-out sell clause in the contract with Ericsson and sold its remaining part of the joint venture back to Ericsson, which thereby became the sole owner of the company.

In 1994, mobile telephony accounted for 85% of the activities in the business area for radio systems, i.e. mainly Ericsson Radio Systems, accounted for half of the billing in Ericsson. The mobile telephony activities spanning both systems and terminals increased their billing with 73%. This year the business area for defence communications was moved over to another Ericsson subsidiary, Ericsson Microwave Systems. Mobile telephony was now considered a core product of Ericsson.
