= Personal Communications Devices =

American mobile phone development and marketing company

Personal Communications Devices, LLC - PCD
- Company type: Private
- Founded: 2008
- Headquarters: Hauppauge, New York, United States
- Key people: Philip Christopher, CEO
- Products: Telecommunications devices

Personal Communications Devices, LLC, also d.b.a. PCD, was a privately held company that worked with wireless technology partners, including wireless service providers and mobile phone-manufacturers to develop, support and bring mobile phones to market in the Americas. PCD partnerships include Pantech-branded phones for Verizon and AT&T, Casio GzOne, HTC products, and most recently, Alcatel One Touch. PCD focused mainly on developing basic, low cost feature phones; with the Virgin Mobile Chaser being the only smart phone developed by the company. It debuted in December, 2011 at a retail price of $99.95 USD, and was the least expensive smart phone available on the market at that time.

It began as the cellphone division of Audiovox in 1984, and was acquired by UTStarcom in 2004. In 2008, it became a privately owned company. The company worked with global manufacturers including Fujitsu, Huawei, Netgear, Sharp, Wistron Corporation, and ZTE; has partnerships with wireless service providers throughout the Americas including AT&T, T-Mobile, Sprint, Verizon, Virgin Mobile, Cricket, U.S. Cellular, Clear, C Spire, Telus, Claro, Cox Communications, Movilnet, Iusacell, Telefónica, Digicel, MTS and Centennial; and has introduced several first-to-market cellular devices within its 25-year history, including the introduction of the first smart phone made available to non-contract consumers.

In 2013, it was sold to Quality One Wireless.
