= Picture CD =

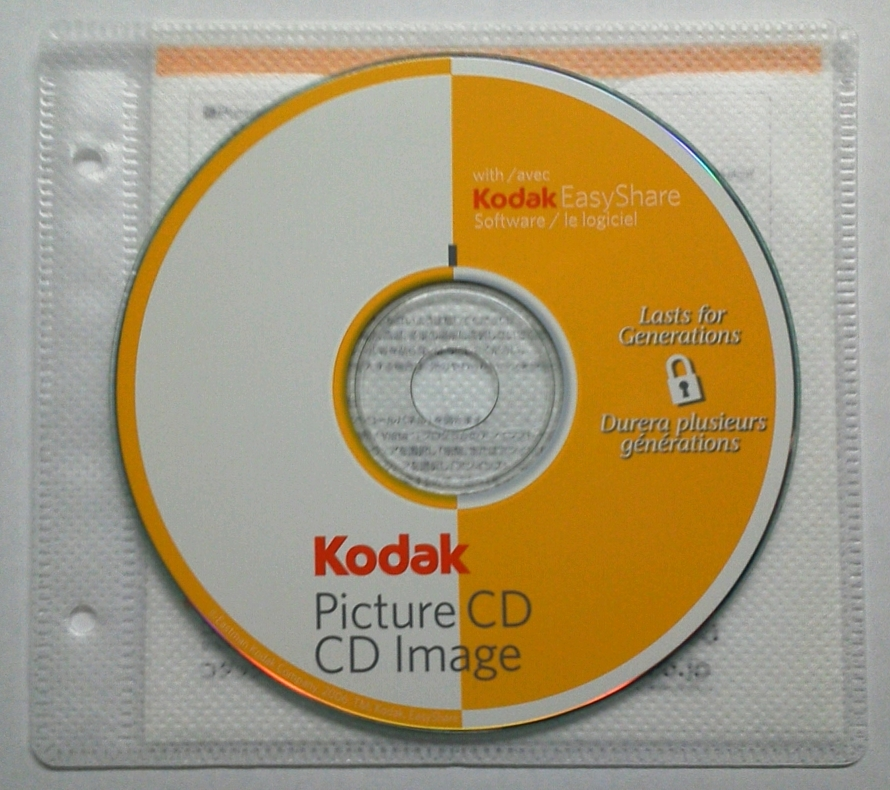
Kodak Picture CD

Picture CD is a product by Kodak, following on from the earlier Photo CD product. It holds photos from a single roll of color film, stored at 1024×1536 resolution using JPEG compression. The product is aimed at consumers. Software to view and perform simple edits to images is included on the CD.

Most digital minilabs and many Kodak Picture Kiosks are capable of producing Kodak Picture CDs from either film or digital pictures. The Picture CD is a standard recordable CD with Kodak software prerecorded. Images are burned onto the CD using a standard CD-R drive. In addition, Picture CDs are also available with thumbnails printed onto the label.
