= Amoi =

Chinese electronics company

- Formerly: Amoisonic
- Type: Private
- Industry: Consumer electronics
- Founded: 1997; 29 years ago
- Headquarters: Xiamen, China
- Products: Mobile phones, smartphones, televisions
- Number of employees: 6000
- Website: amoi.com.cn

Amoi Technology Co., Ltd. (Chinese: 夏新电子) is a Chinese electronics company based in Xiamen, Fujian. It is a mobile service provider which integrates manufacturing, research and development, and sales of mobile communication devices.

== History ==
Amoi has its origins back to 1981 with Xiaxin Electronics Co., Ltd. The company entered the VCR market in 1993. In 1997, Amoi was established as a joint venture under the name Xiamen Xiaxin Electronics Co., Ltd and listed on the Shanghi Stock Exchange. In 2003, it officially changed its name to Amoi Electronics.

== Research and Development ==
Amoi Shanghai Institution, Amoi Research Center.

== Products ==
Amoi manufactures a diverse range of consumer electronics, including mobile phones and LCD televisions, for sale both domestically and internationally.

Amoi also manufactures the 3 Skypephone mobile phone along with the INQ Phone, the social networking phone exclusive to 3 Skypephone.

== Sponsorships ==
- China women's national volleyball team
- Xiamen International Marathon
