= Ericsson Mobile Communications =

Mobile phone subsidiary

Ericsson Mobile Communications AB
- Formerly: Ericsson GE Mobile Communications (1989-1994)
- Type: Subsidiary, Aktiebolag
- Industry: Mobile phones
- Predecessor: Ericsson Radio Systems
- Founded: 1 July 1989; 37 years ago
- Defunct: 1 October 2001; 24 years ago
- Fate: Merged to form Sony Ericsson
- Successor: Sony Ericsson Mobile Communications; Ericsson Mobile Platforms
- Headquarters: Lund, Sweden
- Key people: Åke Lundqvist; Lars Ramqvist; Nils Rydbeck; Johan Siberg
- Parent: Ericsson

Ericsson Mobile Communications AB was a subsidiary of Ericsson, entirely focused on development of mobile phones (handsets). The company formed in 1989 and existed until it was succeeded by Sony Ericsson, a joint venture between Ericsson and Sony, in 2001. Sony fully acquired Ericsson's part in the venture in 2011, concluding what had become a tumultuous and unhappy venture between the two technology giants. The major offices were located in Lund, Kumla, Raleigh, North Carolina and Lynchburg, Virginia.

== History ==
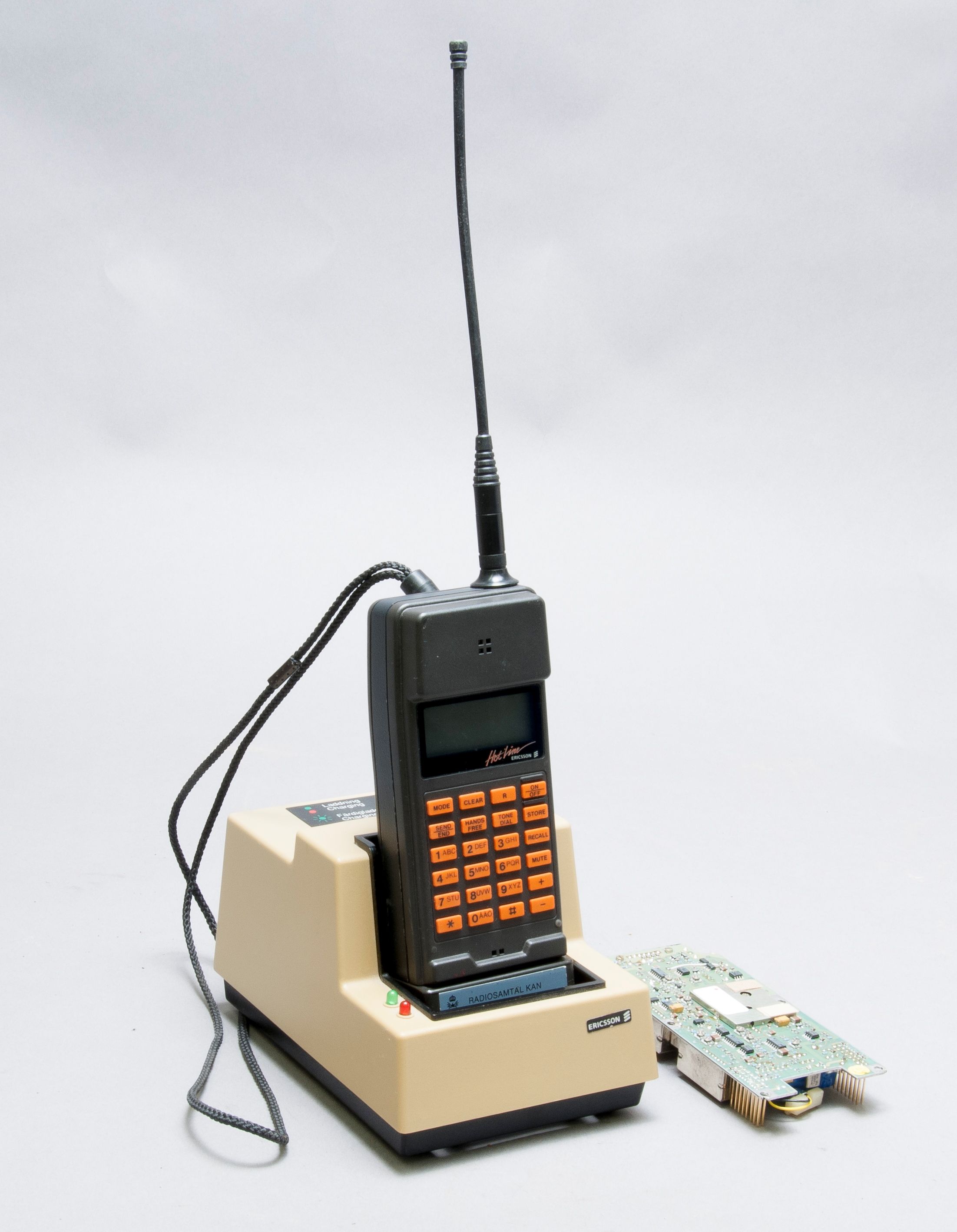
Ericsson Hotline 900 Pocket (1987)

Under the command of Ericsson Radio Systems present CEO Lars Ramqvist, a new joint venture company was formed together with General Electric July 1, 1989, under the name Ericsson GE Mobile Communications. The company consisted of all mobile phone activity of both companies in Sweden and USA. Ericsson owned 60% of the company, and General Electric owned 40%. In this fusion GE contributed, among other things, a factory of some 1,600 employees in Lynchburg, Virginia. Ericsson Radio Systems former CEO Åke Lundqvist moved to the US as CEO for the new company, which also controlled the mobile handset activities in Kumla and the research facility in Lund. Mobile telephony, at this time, constituted 14% of the billing in the business unit for radio communications at Ericsson.

In 1990 Ericsson GE Mobile Communications, at the initiative of Åke Lundkvist, opened a new office for research and development in Research Triangle Park, a science park in Raleigh, North Carolina. The purpose of this initiative was to split research and development from pure manufacturing, thereby mirroring the split between Kumla and Lund in Sweden.

The activity in Ericsson GE Mobile Communications was characterized by severe cooperation problems between the two companies, and inability to break into the U.S. market for mobile phones.

In the beginning of 1992 Ericsson purchased another 20% of the joint venture, thereby increasing their stake in Ericsson GE Mobile Communications to 80%. At the end of 1993 General Electric left the board for the joint venture. Eventually, on April 1, 1998, General Electric used a bail-out sell clause in the contract with Ericsson and sold the remaining 20% of the joint venture back to Ericsson, who thereby became the sole owner of the company.

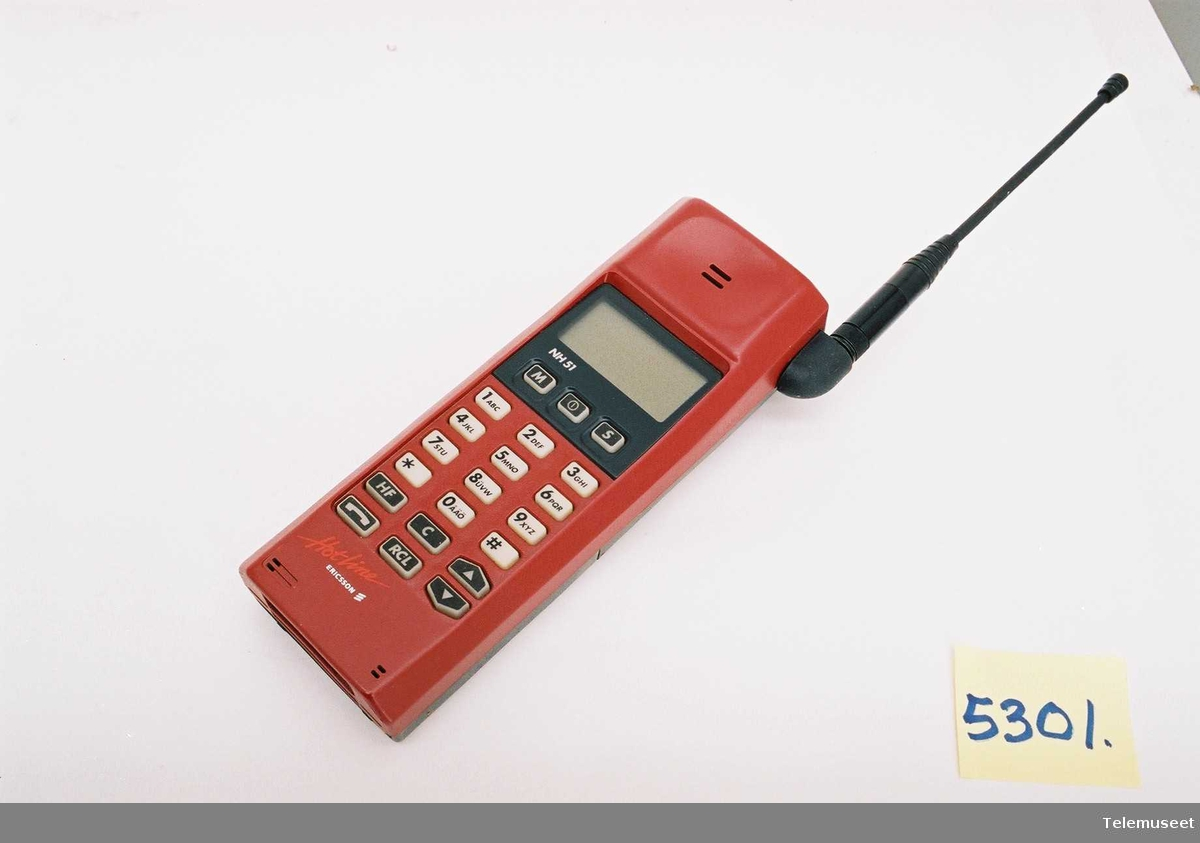
Ericsson Hotline NH51 NMT mobile phone

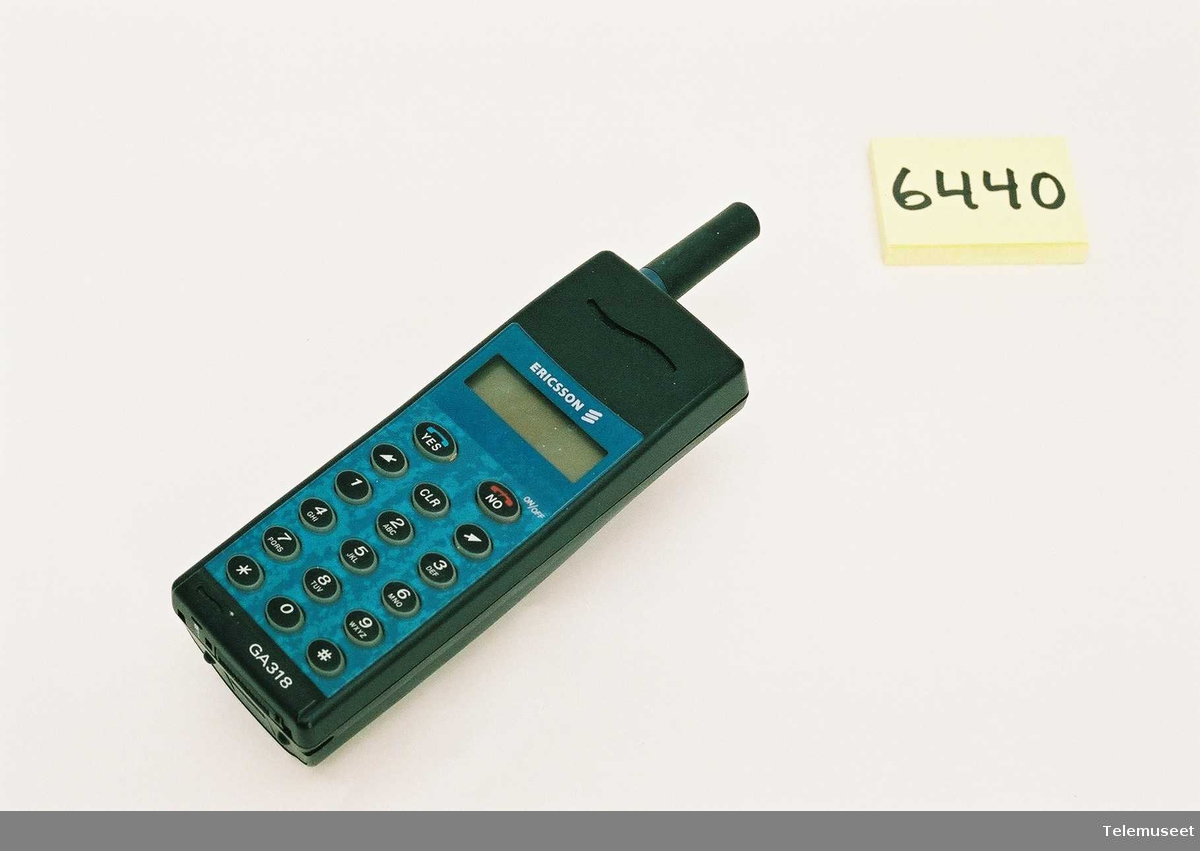
Ericsson GA318 GSM mobile phone

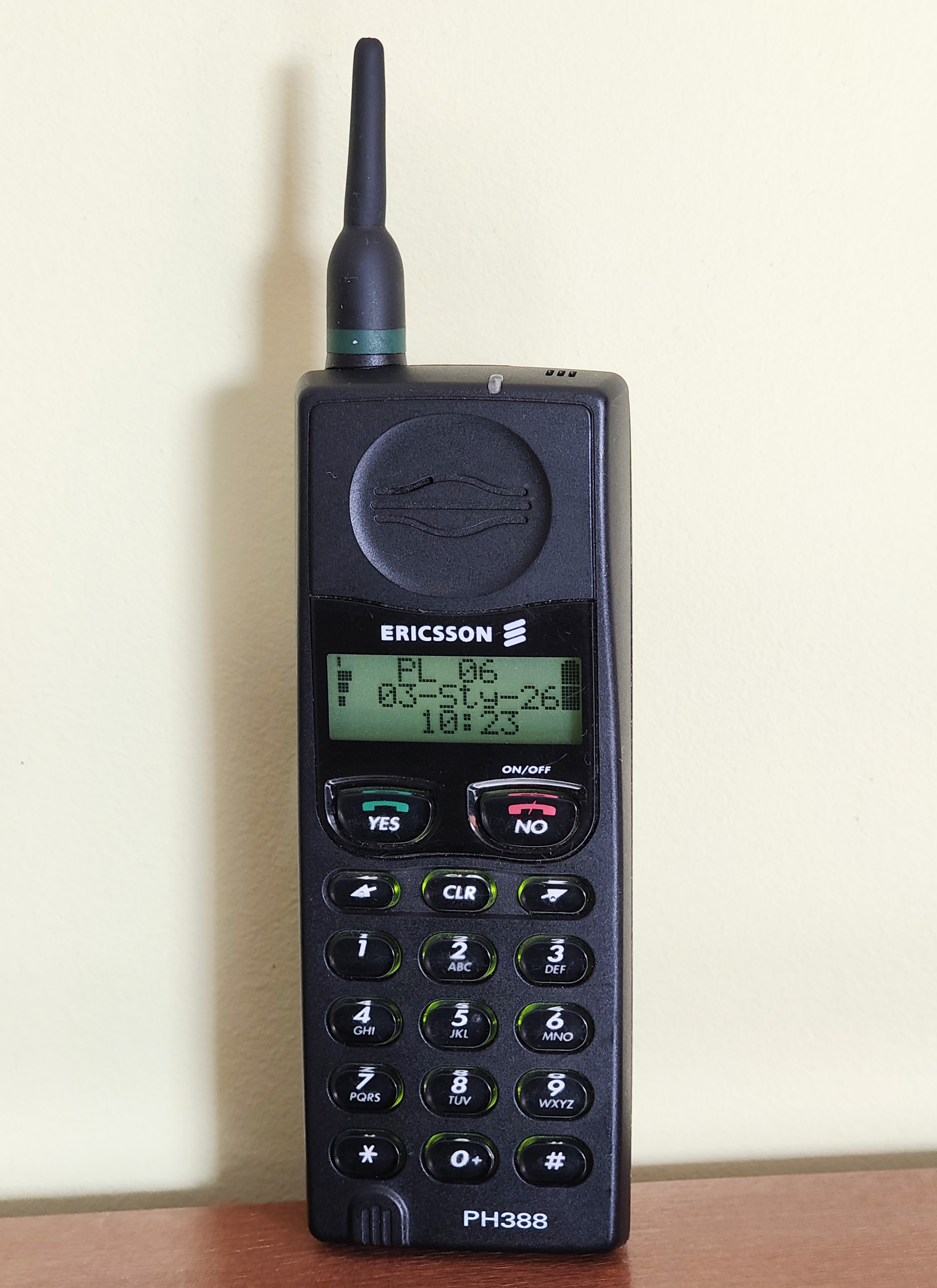
Ericsson PH388, DCS 1800 mobile phone.

In 1994 mobile telephony made up 85% of the activities in the Ericsson business unit for Radio Systems and this business unit increased its billing for activities including systems (base stations) and terminals (handsets) with 73%.

Mobile telephony was now regarded a core product, and on March 1 Johan Siberg assumed the role of CEO, simultaneously changing its name to Ericsson Mobile Communications AB (ECS) and creating a wholly owned subsidiary with its main office in Sweden.

In 1994 a side track activity with the short-distance radio technology Bluetooth was initiated within the company, and in 1997 ECS joined forces with Intel in this activity. In 1998 the Bluetooth Special Interest Group was created in cooperation with Intel, IBM, Nokia and Toshiba, and in 2000 a corporate spin-off named Ericsson Technology Licensing was created to host the technology, and the first actual product, a Bluetooth headset, reached the market.

Growth and volumes in ECS increased rapidly and during the early years all focus was on quickly ramping up production, which was met with success. In 1998 the company generated a profit of 13 billion SEK. However, in 1999 the company already encountered problems in the consumer market, when their main competitor Nokia started to use design as a weapon to gain market share. Nokia 3210 has been described as an especially troublesome product, as it lacked an external antenna. Ericsson viewed this as a technically inferior design, but consumers chose this design direction anyway. At the same time, Nokia started to compete by economies of scale and could thus bring down the price on components.

=== The telecom crisis ===
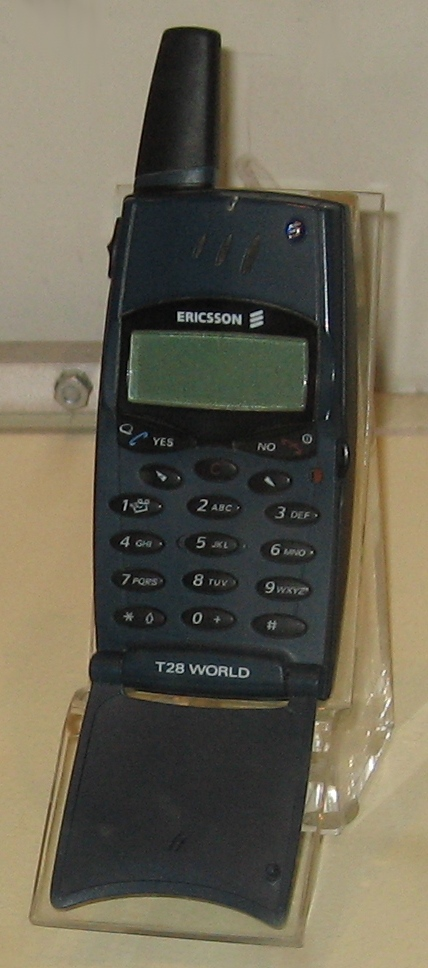
Ericsson T28 World

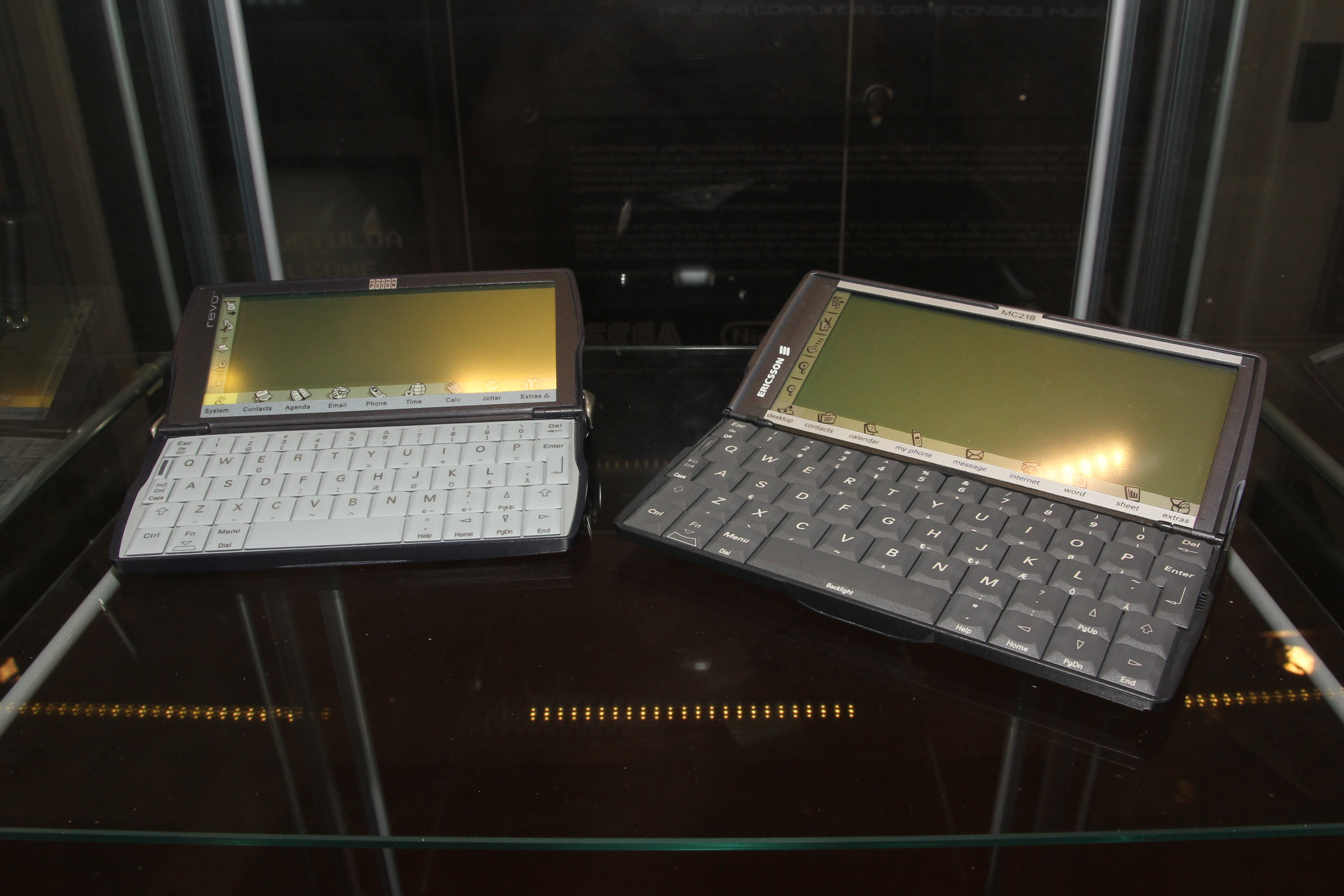
Ericsson MC218 PDA (on the right)

During 1998 the company ran into problems in the completion of their next flagship phone model, Ericsson T28. It was initially planned for introduction in time for the Christmas season of 1998, but the launch was delayed until the autumn of 1999. In March 2000 the Philips factory for radio electronics in Albuquerque, New Mexico was hit by lightning and caught fire, which hit the ECS supply chain very hard, and caused further delays in deliveries. The volume loss has been estimated at 7 million phones. Nokia was able to sign up secondary suppliers before Ericsson and could thus maintain their market lead.

According to a study in 2000, Ericsson was the third largest mobile phone vendor with an 11% market share, trailing Nokia and Motorola.

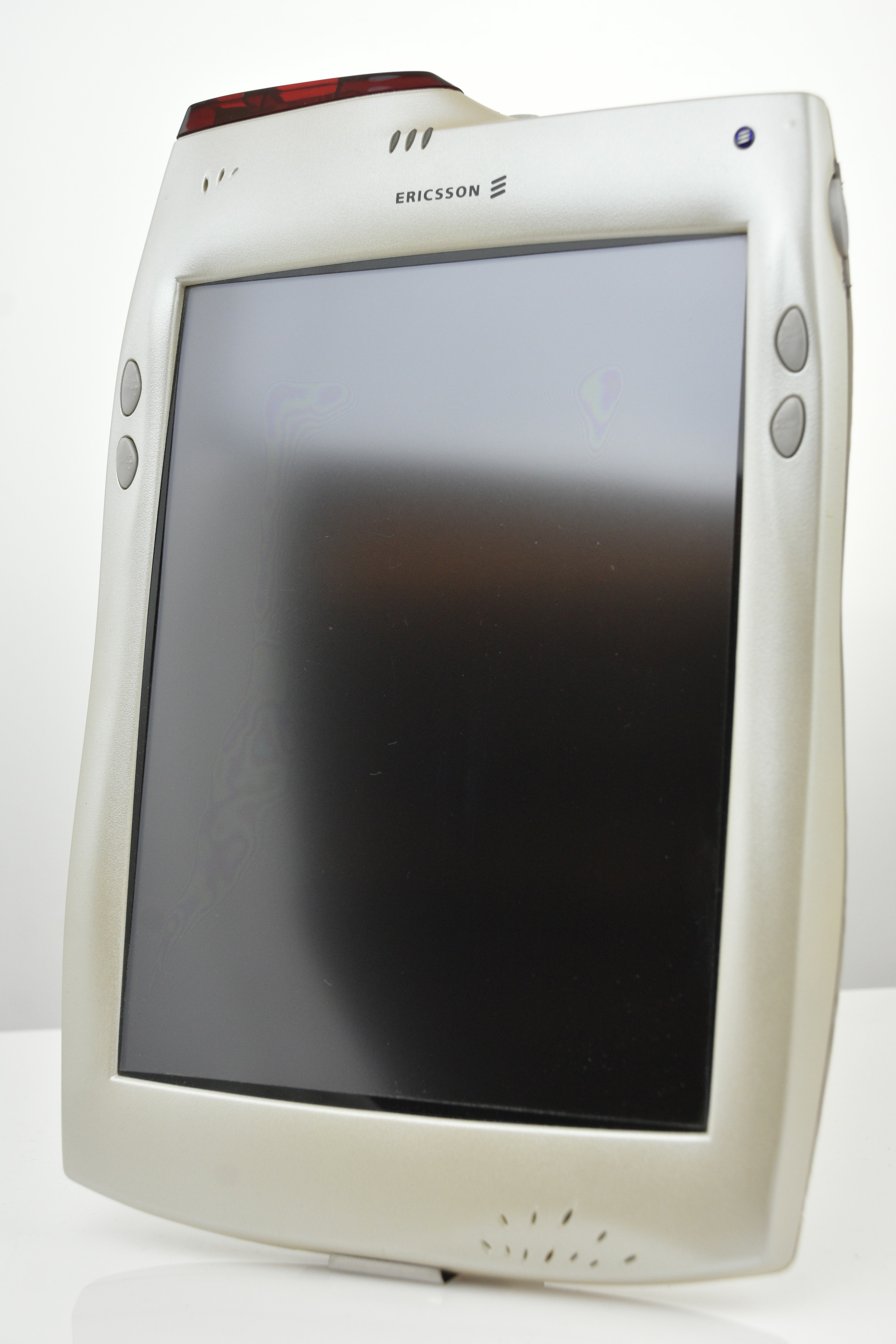
Ericsson Delphipad tablet computer prototype

In 2000 ECS produced its first smartphone, Ericsson R380. It did not meet with commercial success, but was the first phone to use the Symbian operating system, previously known as EPOC. The company also produced a Handheld PC named Ericsson MC218, an OEM-product based on Psion Series 5mx. At this time various experimental projects involving handheld PCs was running: in the annual report of 1999 is a picture of a handheld PC named HS210 cordless display phone which would use Bluetooth to connect to a small base station in a household, and another experimental product was the DelphiPad which was developed in cooperation with the Centre for Wireless Communications in Singapore, a tablet computer with touch-sensitive screen, Netscape Navigator as web browser and Linux as its operating system. These products were never finalized, but pictures of these prototypes have circled the web.

Immediately after the turn of the century 2000–2001 the European telecom crisis occurred, and hit Ericsson Mobile Communications especially hard. The business unit containing ECS would now come to generate a loss of 24 billion SEK.

In the spring of 2001 the first countermeasures to cut down on the losses began by laying off 600 people in production, while simultaneously outsourcing all production with some 11,000 people to Flextronics. The research- and development office in Lund was not subject to any major layoffs: 100 people were laid off and some 80 people in facility management and IS/IT were outsourced. A few months later however, the huge transformation occurred, splitting the company in two.

=== The split in Sony Ericsson and Ericsson Mobile Platforms ===
As a last countermeasure to counter the economic crisis, Ericsson had to seek a partner for the handset production, and therefore the company was split in two parts on 1 October 2001:

- Production and design of mobile phones was transferred to Sony Ericsson Mobile Communications in a joint venture with Sony. Sony Ericsson at this time had some 3,500 employees.
- Mobile platforms, i.e. software and hardware used as a foundation for building mobile phones, were transferred to a new company called Ericsson Mobile Platforms (EMP). Some of the customers of this company was to be HTC, LG, NEC, Sagem, Sharp and of course Sony Ericsson. The main focus in this company would become to produce a mobile platform for third generation mobile telephony, UMTS.

On 12 February 2009, Ericsson issued a press release stating that Ericsson Mobile Platforms would be joined with STMicroelectronics mobile platform company ST-NXP Wireless, forming the new joint venture ST-Ericsson, owned 50/50 by Ericsson and STMicroelectronics.

In February 2012, Sony communicated that they closed the purchase of Ericsson's part of Sony Ericsson, which was consequently renamed Sony Mobile Communications. At this time the company had roughly 8,000 employees globally.

== Products and platforms ==
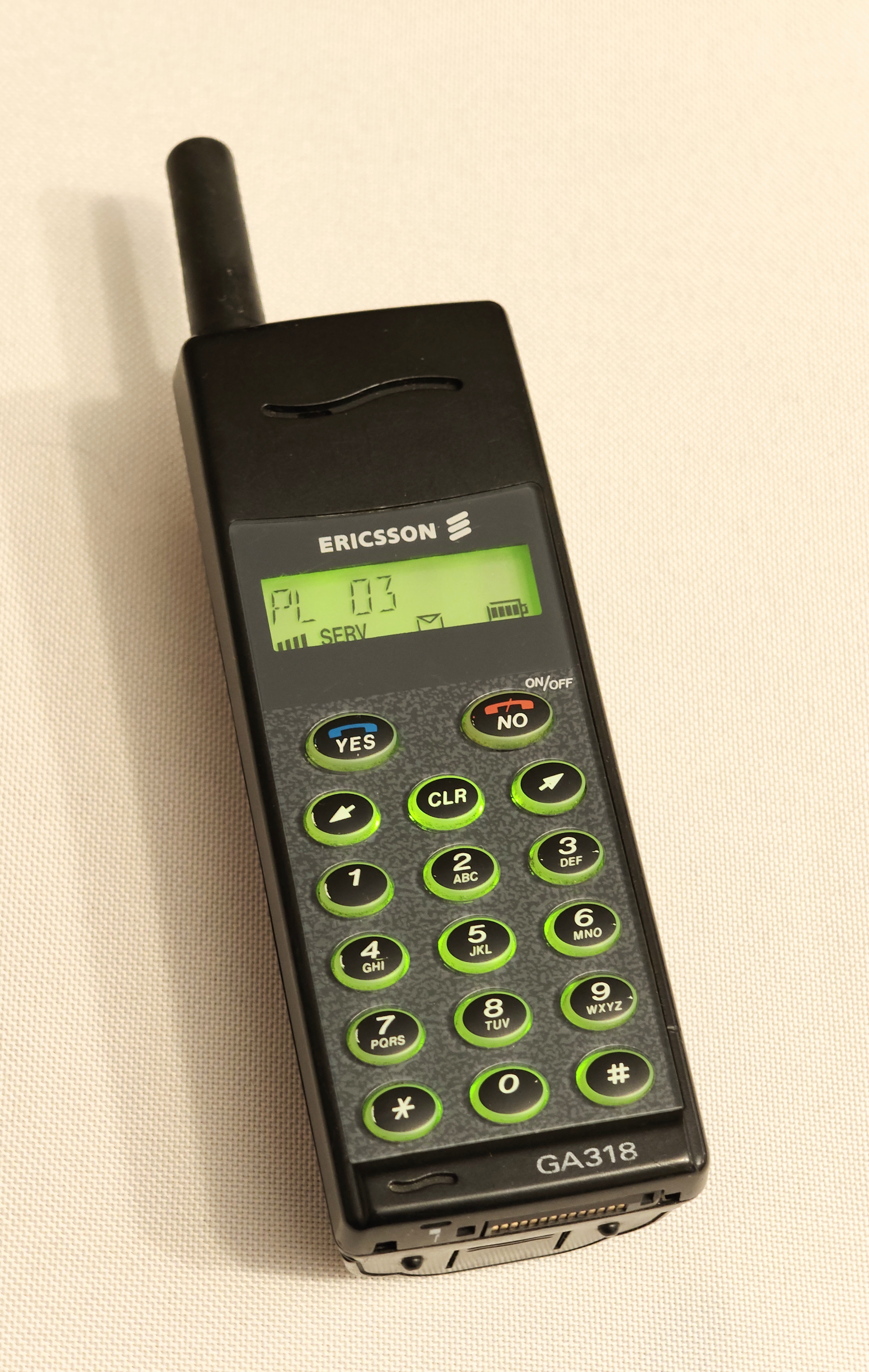
Ericsson GA318 (GSM 900)

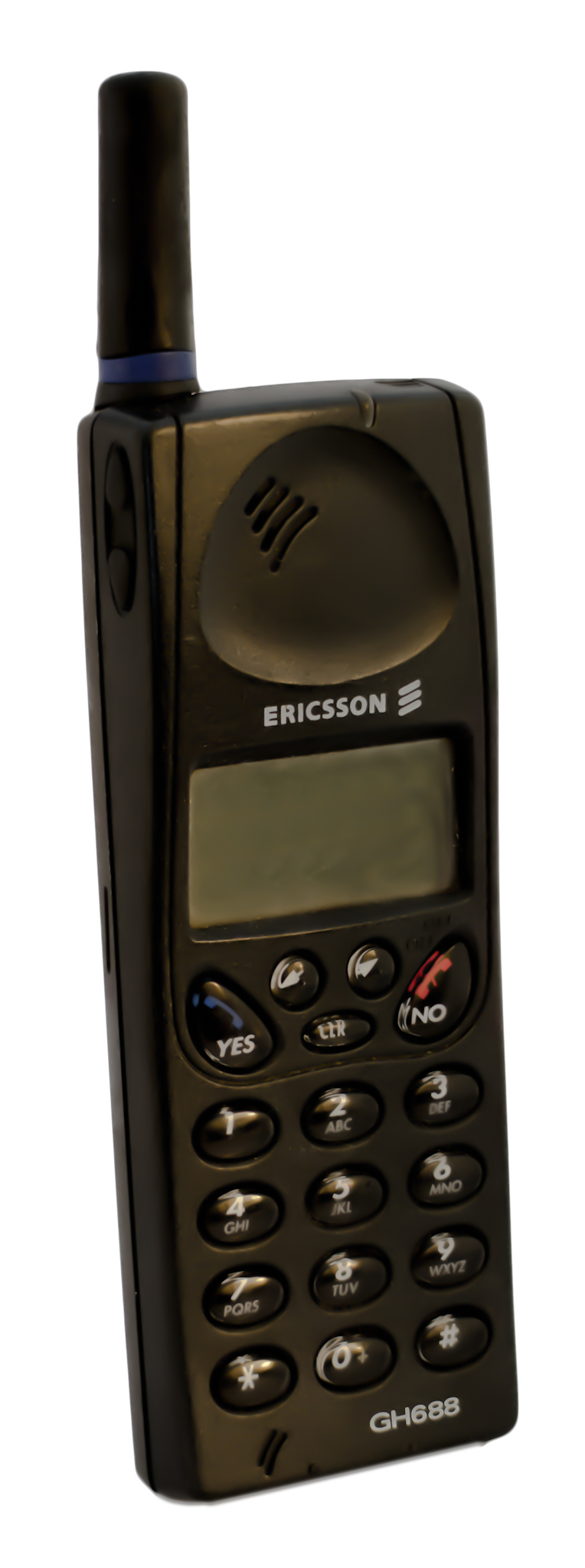
Ericsson GH688, is a GSM phone on the Jane-platform

The earlier product lines from Ericsson Radio Systems had, at the inception of Ericsson Mobile Communications, started to form platforms, which consisted of a certain electronic and mechanic design, and even if many different models were produced on top of one and the same platform, the early platforms can easily be recognized by their looks:

Platform	Introduced	NMT-models	ETACS-models	GSM-models	Combo	Ref
Curt	1987	HotLine Pocket 900	-	-	-	
Olivia	1989	NH72	EH72	GH172	-	
Sandra	1991	NH97	EH97	GH197, GH198	-	
Jane	1996	NH237	EH237	GH337, GH388, GA318, GA628, GH688, A1018	TH688 (DECT+GSM), SH888 (modem), I888 (GSM 900+1900), S868 (GSM 900+1800)	
Emma	1996			GF768, PF768, GF788, T18	-	
Marianne	1998	-	-	T28, T36	-	

As can be seen from the table there is a certain system in the model designations: the first letter indicates the radio standard (N=NMT, E=ETACS, G=GSM), the second letter specifies the mechanical design (H=Handheld, F=Flip), and the number indicates the platform used. Around the year 2000 the range of models increase, platforms and codenames explode and the model names can no longer be derived in a simple way. At the split of the company into SonyEricsson and Ericsson Mobile Platforms, the number of models continued growing in Sony Ericsson while Ericsson Mobile Platforms cut down on the pace and produced a few platforms with names such as U100, U200 and so on.
