= Pantech =

South Korean mobile phone company

Pantech Inc. 주식회사 팬택
- Type: Public
- Founded: 1991; 35 years ago
- Headquarters: Digital Media City, Seoul, South Korea
- Area served: United States, Japan, China, Europe, Vietnam
- Key people: Chung Joon, (CEO)
- Products: Smartphone, Tablet
- Revenue: ▲$2.8 billion USD (2011)
- Number of employees: 12,300 (2011)
- Parent: Solid Inc. (96%); Optis Inc. (4%)
- Website: www.pantech.com

Pantech Inc. (Korean: 주식회사 팬택) is a South Korean company that manufactures mobile phones. Established in 1991, its market is mainly domestic with partners in the United States, Japan, China, Europe and Vietnam. In 2012 Pantech was the second best-selling handset maker in South Korea, according to Gartner. In 2013 Samsung Electronics bought a 10% stake in Pantech. Pantech also partners with PCD for specialized phones.

For the U.S. market, the company primarily manufactures phones for the two largest wireless carriers, AT&T and Verizon. Pantech launched an eco-friendly 3G messaging phone for AT&T as well as a 4G LTE Android handset for Verizon Wireless in 2012. Both smartphones have touchscreens and QWERTY keyboards that slide out.

According to a report in July 2014 from CNET, Pantech is facing bankruptcy risk with a debt of $475 million. In October 2015, BusinessKorea said that Korean regulators have approved the acquisition by a domestic technology group led by Optis and Solid.

== Released in South Korea ==
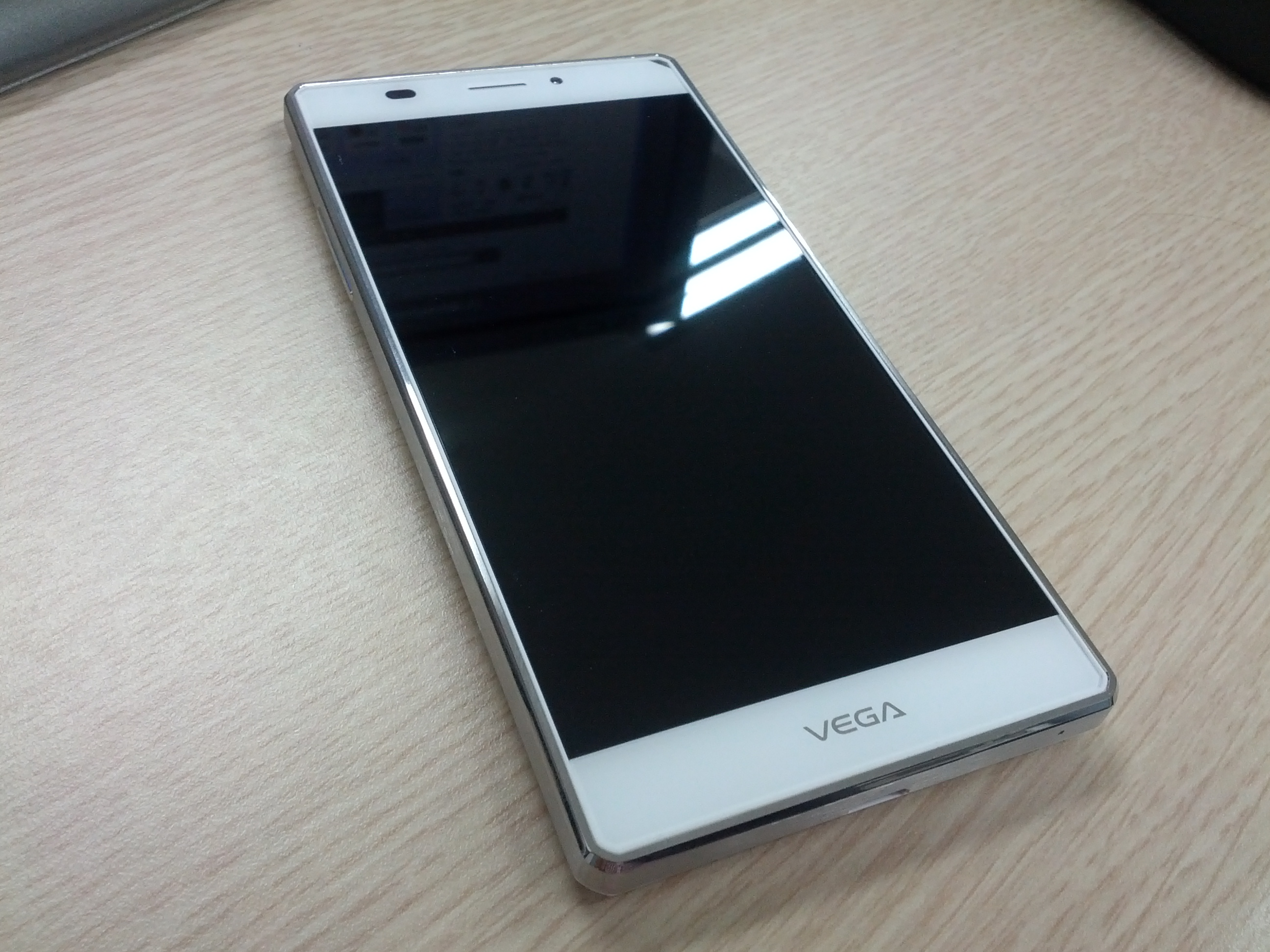
Pantech vega iron phone

Smartphones manufactured by Pantech and released in South Korea

=== 3G Smartphone ===
- Pantech Curitel PH-S8000T

Released in 2005, Pantech's Windows Mobile SmartPhone. Operating system is Windows Mobile 2003 Second Edition for Smart phone OS.

- Pantech SKY Sirius (IM-A600)
- Pantech SKY izar (IM-A630)
- Pantech SKY VEGA(IM-A650)
- Pantech SKY Mirach (IM-A690)
- Pantech SKY VEGA Xpress (IM-A710/A720)
  - Pantech SKY VEGA X+ (IM-A725)
  - Pantech SKY VEGA S (IM-A730)
- Pantech SKY Mirach A (IM-A740)
- Pantech SKY Vega (IM-A650)
- Pantech SKY Vega Racer (IM-A760/A770/A775/A780)
- Pantech SKY VEGA N°5 (IM-T100)

=== LTE Smartphone ===
- Pantech SKY VEGA LTE (IM-A800)
  - Pantech SKY VEGA LTE M (IM-A810)
  - Pantech SKY VEGA LTE EX (IM-A820)
- Pantech SKY VEGA Racer 2 (IM-A830)
- Pantech SKY VEGA S5 (IM-A840)
- Pantech VEGA R3 (IM-A850)
- Pantech VEGA N°6 (IM-A860)
- Pantech VEGA Iron (IM-A870)
- Pantech VEGA LTE-A (IM-A880)

Pantech launched Vega LTE-A in August 2013.

- Pantech VEGA Secret Note (IM-A890)

Pantech Vega Secret Note was launched in South Korea in October 2013. The device records 200,000 units of sales in just 30 days after launched in South Korea.

- Pantech VEGA Secret Up (IM-A900)

Pantech Vega Secret Up was launched in South Korea in December 2013. The device received the Android 4.4.2 KitKat update in April 2014.

- Pantech Vega Iron 2 (IM-A910)

Pantech Vega Iron 2 was launched in South Korea in May 2014. The device runs Android 4.4.2 Kitkat

- Pantech VEGA Popup Note (IM-A920)
- Pantech VEGA Secret Note 2 (IM-A930)
- Pantech IM-A940K
- Pantech SKY I'm Back (IM-100)

Pantech SKY I'm Back was launched in South Korea in June 2016. The device runs Android 6.0.1 Marshmallow

== Pantech USA phones and wireless devices ==
Mobile phones and wireless devices manufactured by Pantech:

=== AT&T ===
- Pantech C630

The model C630 is a slim candy-bar sized phone, featuring an MP3 player, a MicroSD card slot, a 1.3-megapixel camera, GPS functionality, 3G HSDPA, and a 1.8 inch display with 176×220 resolution.

- Pantech Slate

The Slate (marketed as _SLATE) is slim, like the C630, with a QWERTY keyboard, an MP3 player, a MicroSD card slot, a 1.3-megapixel camera, and a 2.2 inch display with 220×176 resolution, but without 3G or a GPS functionality.

- Pantech C610

The C610 is a clamshell phone, featuring an MP3 player, a MicroSD card slot, a 1.3-megapixel camera, GPS functionality, 3G HSDPA, and a 1.8 inch display with 176×220 resolution.

- Pantech Matrix

The Matrix is a double-slide phone. It has a full QWERTY keyboard and a traditional T9 keyboard. When closed, the phone can be slid left to use the QWERTY keyboard, or up, to show the T9 keyboard. The phone has an MP3 player, a MicroSD card slot, a 1.3-megapixel camera, GPS functionality, 3G HDSPA, and a 2.2 inch display with 240×320 resolution.

- Pantech Matrix Pro

The Matrix PRO is similar to the Matrix model, yet more rounded in shape. The Matrix Pro features a 2.4 inch display, and 2-megapixel camera. It comes with Microsoft Windows Mobile 6.1 OS.

- Pantech Reveal

The Pantech Reveal is a square shaped with rounded corners. It is about 3 inches long and 2 inches wide, with a 2-megapixel camera.

- Pantech Pursuit

The Pursuit is Pantech's first touchscreen phone, featuring a full, four-row QWERTY keyboard, designed for quick messaging.

- Pantech Laser

The Laser is a touchscreen messaging phone with a full QWERTY keyboard. Marketed as "the world's thinnest messaging phone", it measures less than a centimeter.

- Pantech Ease

The Ease is a touch screen phone featuring a full slide-out QWERTY keyboard, and a 2.0-megapixel camera. Facebook, mobile web, and mobile e-mail are built in.

- Pantech Link

The Pantech Link is a quick messaging phone with a QWERTY keyboard. Facebook, mobile web, and messaging are built in. It features a 1.3-megapixel camera and camcorder.

- Pantech Breeze III

The Breeze III is a clamshell phone with a 1.3-megapixel camera and camcorder. It features mobile e-mail, Facebook, and instant messaging.

- Pantech Breeze IV

Released in the United States in November 2013, "the fourth model in its feature phone line". This model has been described as "a pared down flip phone" in the context of a Motorola Moto E product review.

- Pantech Pursuit II

The Pursuit II is a vertical slide QWERTY keyboard phone. It has a 2.0-megapixel camera and camcorder. It features Twitter, Facebook, mobile e-mail, instant messaging, and other social networking options.

- Pantech Crossover

The Crossover is a vertical slide QWERTY keyboard phone.

- Pantech Renue

The Renue is a feature phone that includes a 3.2 inch touchscreen display and a full, four-row slide-out QWERTY keyboard, as well as a 3-megapixel camera with camcorder.

- Pantech Element

The Element is Pantech's first tablet. It is marketed to be water- and dust-resistant, and also contains an 8 inch touchscreen, dual 2 MP front/5 MP back cameras with 720p camcorder, and a dual-core 1.5 GHz Qualcomm Snapdragon S3 processor to power it.

- Pantech Pocket
- Pantech Burst
- Pantech Flex
- Pantech Discover
- Pantech Vybe

A messaging phone, focused on supporting text messaging, designed for and marketed only in the United States market, released in May 2014.

=== Verizon ===
- Pantech Breakout

The Breakout is a smartphone with LTE capabilities. It runs Android 2.3 Gingerbread.

- Pantech Razzle

The Razzle has a bottom portion that swivels 180°. One side has stereo speakers and music controls (pause/play, fast forward, rewind); the other side contains a full QWERTY keyboard. It has a MicroSD slot, a 1.3-megapixel camera, and GPS functionality.

- Pantech Jest

The Jest is square shaped with rounded corners. Its dimensions are approximately 3 inches long and 2 inches wide. The Jest has a slide down QWERTY keyboard and a 2-megapixel camera.

- Pantech UMW190

The UMW190 is a global ready mobile broadband USB modem. It is capable of connecting to several networks: EV-DO (Rev. 0 and Rev. A) and GSM.

- Pantech Crux

The Crux is an all-touch screen/slider phone with a unique feature: the user must slide the phone up to unlock and down to lock it. It does not have a physical QWERTY keyboard. The phone features a music player, a microSD card slot (ships with 1 GB card; pre-installed), and a 3.0-megapixel camera and camcorder.

- Pantech Marauder

The Marauder is a 4G LTE Android smartphone that runs Android 4.0 Ice Cream Sandwich. It features a 3.8 inch touchscreen display, a five-row slide-out QWERTY keyboard, a 5-megapixel rear camera, and a VGA resolution front-facing camera (0.3 megapixels). It has an optional "starter mode" to simplify the user interface for first time Android users.

- Pantech Hotshot

The Hotshot is a 3G device that uses CDMA technology. The device has a 3.2 inch touchscreen display, offers Bluetooth connectivity, and has a 3.2-megapixel camera, among other features.

- Pantech Perception

== See also ==
- Economy of South Korea
- Communications in South Korea
- Pantech Wireless
