= Rainbow Books =

Book series that contains the specifications of Compact Discs

Cover for the Green Book (CD-i) specification standard, in its eponymous color

The main formats established by the books, from left to right in order of publication

The Rainbow Books are a collection of CD format specifications, generally written and published by the companies involved in their development, including Philips, Sony, Matsushita and JVC, among others.

A number of these specifications have been officially adopted by established standards bodies, including the ISO, IEC, and ECMA.

== Red Book (1980) ==
- CD-DA (Digital Audio) – originally published by Philips and Sony on September 19, 1980, it was later standardized as IEC 60908:1987 and later IEC 60908:1999.
  - CD-Text – a 1996 extension to CD-DA
  - CD-MIDI – part of the original Red Book standard
  - CD+G (plus Graphics) – an extension of the Red Book specifications used mainly for karaoke
    - CD+EG (plus Extended Graphics) – an extension of CD+G

== Yellow Book (1983) ==
- CD-ROM (Read-Only Memory) – originally developed by Philips and Sony, it was standardized as ISO/IEC 10149 in 1988 and ECMA-130 in 1989
  - CD-ROM XA (eXtended Architecture) – a 1991 extension of CD-ROM, developed by Philips and Sony

== Green Book (1986) ==
- CD-i (Interactive) – standard developed and published by Philips.

== Orange Book (1990) ==
Orange is a reference to the fact that red and yellow mix to orange. This correlates with the fact that CD-R and CD-RW are capable of audio ("Red") and data ("Yellow"); although other colors (other CD standards) that do not mix are capable of being burned onto the physical medium. Orange Book also introduced the standard for multisession writing.

- CD-MO (Magneto-Optical)
- CD-R (Recordable) alias CD-WO (Write Once) alias CD-WORM (Write Once, Read Many) – originally developed by Sony and Philips, it was partially standardized as ECMA-394.
- CD-RW (ReWritable) alias CD-E (Eraseable) – originally developed by Philips, Sony and Ricoh, it was partially standardized as ECMA-395.

== Beige Book (1992) ==
- Photo CD (Photo) — proprietary standard jointly developed by Philips and Eastman Kodak; never released to the public

== White Book (1993) ==
The White Book refers to a standard of compact disc that stores pictures and video.

- CD-i Bridge - a bridge format between CD-ROM XA and the Green Book CD-i, which is the base format for Video CDs, Super Video CDs and Photo CDs.
- VCD (Video) – a standard jointly developed and published by JVC, Matsushita, Philips and Sony.
  - SVCD (Super Video, 1998) – a 1998 extension of VCD, standardized as IEC 62107 in 2000.

== Blue Book (1995) ==
The Blue Book is a compact disc standard that defines the Enhanced Music CD format, which combines audio tracks and data tracks on the same disc.

- E-CD/CD+/CD Extra (Enhanced) – a standard jointly developed and published by Microsoft, Philips and Sony

== Scarlet Book (1999) ==
Scarlet color of this book is a reference to the Red Book, which defines original CDDA.

- SACD (Super Audio) – a standard jointly developed and published by Philips and Sony

== Purple Book (2000) ==
A standard developed by Philips and Sony in the late 1990s, with over 1 GB in capacity and recordable/re-recordable capabilities.

- DDCD (Double Density) – divided in three separate specifications:
  - DD-ROM (Double Density Read-Only)
  - DD-R (Double Density Recordable)
  - DD-RW (Double Density ReWritable)

== See also ==
- ISO 9660, a 1986 filesystem standard used in conjunction with CD-ROM formats.
- Orange-Book-Standard, a decision named after the Compact Disc standard, issued in 2009 by the German Federal Court of Justice on the interaction between patent law and standards
