= KinderVentures =

Classroom software

KinderVentures is a series of classroom software and multisensory programs developed in the 1990s by Optical Data Interactive (a.k.a. Optical Data School Media).

KinderVentures contains "four-module, multi-sensory, interdisciplinary kindergarten curriculum for Windows on Science, including videodisc adventures, manipulative kits, Wanderoo Boogie music collection, and three multi-media CD-ROM games using the characters."

== Wanderoos ==
Wanderoos consists of two titles: The Wanderoos Go to Town (1994) and The Wanderoos Go Exploring (1994). The games were developed by Optical Data Interactive, for 3-8 year olds, and The Wanderoos CD-ROMs grew out of KinderVentures, a video-disk-based science program designed for kindergarten classes. The two titles were Optical Data's first ventures into the consumer market. The series was released onto Mixed Mode dual-format CD-rom for Windows and Macintosh computers.

The games see Pocket and Tails, two kangaroos, guide the user through Wanderooville to explore a doctor's office, a grocery store, a museum, a school and an auto shop. The games covered human biology, the senses, exercise, personal care, people, food and nutrition. Educational content includes matching games with numbers, shapes, colors, and picture puzzles. Players have to find six Wanderoos and the difficulty increases as they do. Meanwhile, the games contained over 100 full-motion Quicktime video clips and 350 digitized pictures. Go To Town includes four songs on the CD-ROM.

== Kits ==
Windows on Science created an accompanying kit called Feed Me! Investigating the Need of Living Things, in English and Spanish. Amazing Me: How the Body Works and Maths and Science Are Around are other kit within KinderVentures.

== Critical reception ==
Mac User gave both Wanderoo titles a score of 4 stars out of 5. Seattle Times deemed Go To Town "One of the nicest programs for the kindergarten", praised the animation voices, sound effects, and screen art as design with "the audience in mind". THE KIDS' COMPUTING CORNER questioned whether young players would engage with the educational content while on the seeking Wanderoos. PC Gamer lamented "Kids can't manipulate the [education] information [delivered by video], so most of the exploration and discovery is centered around the interface itself.
