= Enhanced CD =

Certification mark

Official Enhanced Compact Disc logo/trademark

Enhanced Music Compact Disc logo/trademark

Compact Disc Interactive logo/trademark

Enhanced CD is a certification mark of the Recording Industry Association of America for various technologies that combine audio and computer data for use in both CD-Audio and CD-ROM players.

Formats that fall under the enhanced CD category include mixed mode CD (Yellow Book CD-ROM/Red Book CD-DA), CD-i, CD-i Ready, and CD-Extra/CD-Plus (Blue Book, also called simply Enhanced Music CD or E-CD).

== See also ==
- CD player
- CDVU+
- DualDisc
- Mixed Mode CD
- Super Audio CD
