= Mixed-mode CD =

Compact disc in which two different data types are combined

A mixed-mode CD is a compact disc which contains both data and audio in one session. Typically the first track is a data track while the rest are audio tracks. The most common use for mixed-mode CDs is to add CD-quality audio to video games on a CD.

The term "enhanced CD" is sometimes used to refer to mixed-mode CDs, though it is most commonly used to refer to either a more general category of formats that mix audio and data tracks, or to the particular Enhanced Music CD format.

== Overview ==
Mixed-mode CDs are implicitly described in the original CD-ROM standard (the Yellow Book, later standardized as ISO/IEC 10149 and ECMA-130), which allows a CD-ROM to contain only data tracks, or data tracks and audio tracks. The CD-ROM standard, however, does not mention the term "mixed mode", nor does it describe any particular order of data and audio tracks on the disc. Since the original CD-ROM standard did not support multiple sessions, mixed-mode CDs are created using only one session.

Some CD players manufactured prior to the mid-to-late-1990s have trouble with the mixed-mode CD format because the first track, which contains data, might be "played", resulting in screeching which, at worst, might damage speakers. This is caused by the player not recognizing the "data" flag bit for the track that distinguishes it from an audio track; these players were designed for audio CDs only, with no provisions to handle CD-ROMs with both data and audio tracks. As a result, it attempts to play back the data file as an audio recording, converting the encoded data into incongruous noise that can exceed the limitations of commercial speakers. Newer audio CD players do check for data tracks and (at least) mute the track if it contains data and not audio.

Several newer formats were created to improve the usability of CDs with audio and data tracks in audio CD players; these formats include CD-i, CD-i Ready, and Enhanced CDs (both Blue Book-standard and non-standard enhanced CDs). In the case of the latter, audio tracks are placed in one session before the data tracks, which are stored in a second session. This avoids the problem with the data track for most audio players, since they will only be able to recognize the first session.

== Use in video games ==
Most games released for the Mega-CD/Sega CD and NEC PC Engine CD/TurboGrafx CD are mixed-mode CDs. Several games for the PC, Amiga, PlayStation, Sega Saturn, and Dreamcast are mixed-mode CDs as well. Games ported from floppy disk or cartridge media to a CD would often have the music replaced with (Red Book) audio CD tracks, using the mixed-mode format.

As an alternative, some games embed video and audio in CD-ROM data files and tend not to use CD audio tracks in the game, usually taking advantage of XA interleaving. This was the norm for and including Full-motion video (FMV) games, as the CD drive speed and system RAM size were not adequate to pre-load the video from the disc completely into RAM before playing it, so it had to be played (streamed) directly from the disc, and the CD drive could not read two tracks (a data track containing the video, and an audio track) at the same time.

A short Red Book audio track was sometimes included with non-mixed-mode games anyway, so that when these discs are played in a CD player, the player will reproduce a recorded warning announcement, typically stating that the disc is not meant to be run in an audio CD player before instructing the listener to eject the disc immediately. Bonus audio tracks might also be included on the disc as Easter eggs for the player to find when the game software is not running.

== See also ==
- EncryptEase
