= Blue Book (CD standard) =

Standard for CDs containing both audio and computer data

Enhanced Music Compact Disc logo/trademark

The Blue Book is a compact disc standard developed in 1995 by Philips and Sony. It defines the Enhanced Music CD format (E-CD, also known as CD-Extra, CD-Plus and CD+), which combines audio tracks and data tracks on the same disc. The format was created as a way to solve the problem of mixed mode CDs, which were not properly supported by many CD players.

E-CDs are created through the stamped multisession technology, which creates two sessions on a disc. The first session of an E-CD contains audio tracks according to the Red Book. As a consequence, existing compact disc players can play back this first session as an audio disc. The second session contains CD-ROM data files with content often related to the audio tracks in the first session. The second session will only be used by computer systems equipped with a CD-ROM drive, or by special “Enhanced CD players”.

The second session of a E-CD contains one track in CD-ROM XA Mode 2, Form 1 format. It must contain certain specific files inside an ISO 9660 file system, though an HFS file system may also be included for compatibility with the classic Mac OS. The mandatory files and directories include an autorun.inf file compatible with the Windows 95 AutoRun feature; a CDPLUS and a PICTURES directories; and an optional DATA directory.

The technology was originally developed by Albhy Galuten who, along with Ty Roberts, brought the idea to the major record labels where it was built into commercial releases. There were other technologies that solved the same problem, but they were not compatible with many existing CD players and so this approach was brought to Sony and Philips where it was written into the Blue Book standard.

The term "enhanced CD" is also an umbrella term and a certification mark used to refer to different CD formats that support audio and data content, including mixed mode CDs, CD-i and CD-i Ready.
