= CD-i Ready =

Compact disc format

CD-i Ready is a compact disc format for mixing audio and data content on a CD. It was developed by Philips in 1991, based on the CD-i format. The CD-i Ready format uses a certain technique to get audio CD players to skim over the CD-i software and data. CD-i Ready places software and data in the pregap of track 1 (index 0). Most CD players skip the pregap area assuming it contains only silence. Because of this, CD-i Ready was presented as an alternative to CD-i (which stores data in the regular indexes of the first tracks of a disc), which was more compatible with audio CD players.

The term "enhanced CD" is sometimes used to refer to different CD formats that support a mix of audio and data content. Apart from CD-i Ready and CD-i, these formats include mixed mode CDs and the Enhanced Music CD format.
