= Maspro Denkoh =

Japanese electronics manufacturer

Maspro Denkoh Corporation

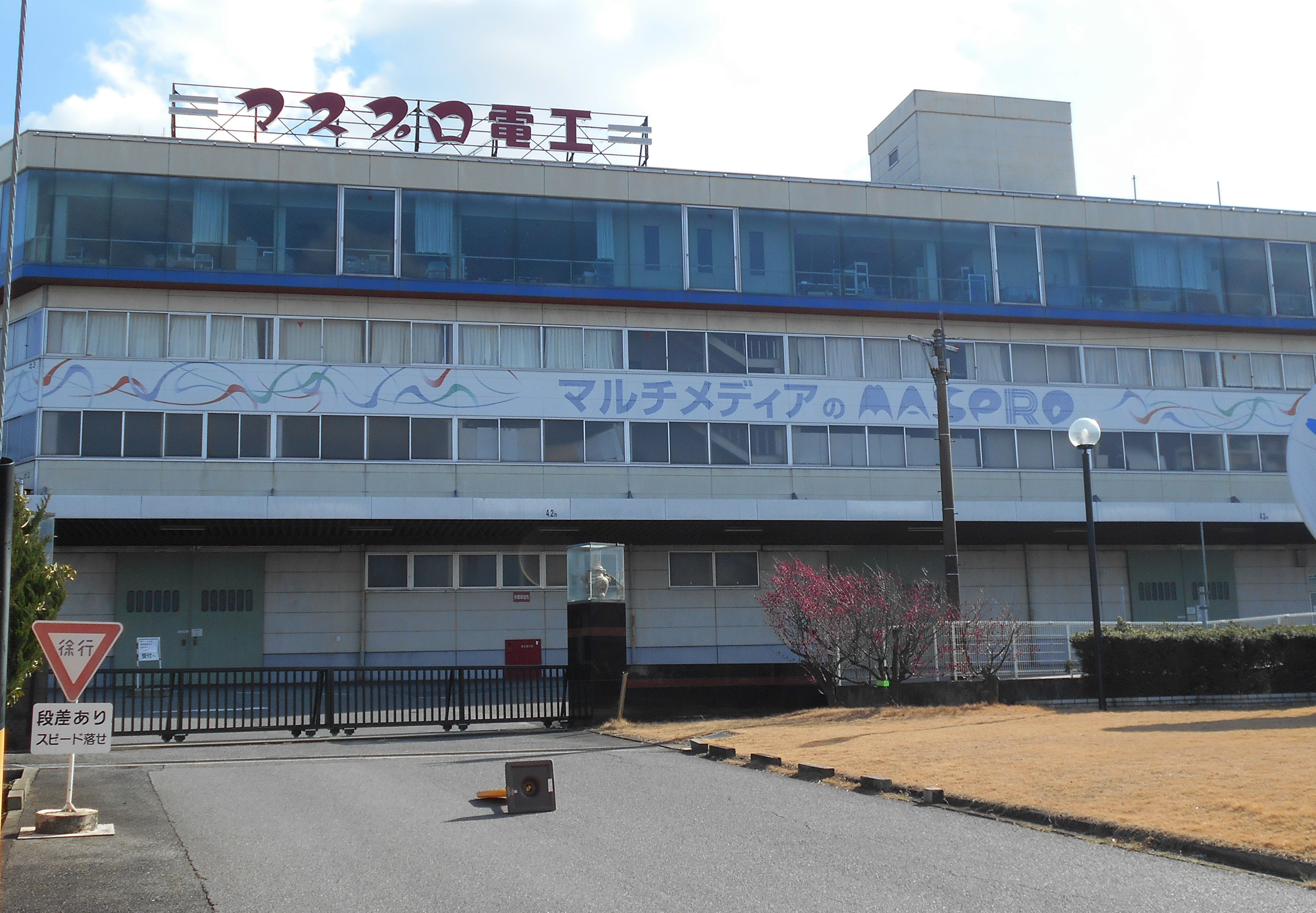
- Headquarters in Nisshin, Aichi
- Native name: マスプロ電工株式会社
- Romanized name: Masupuro Kabushiki-gaisha
- Company type: Public K.K.
- Traded as: TYO: 6749
- Industry: Electronics
- Founded: September 9, 1955
- Headquarters: Nisshin, Aichi, Japan
- Number of employees: 846 (As of March 31, 2007)
- Website: Maspro Denkoh (en) alternative site

Maspro Denkoh is a Japanese electronics manufacturer, headquartered in Nisshin, Aichi, Japan.

In 2005, the firm chose the auctioneer of their $20 million art collection through a game of rock, paper, scissors. Christie's won.

== Overview ==
Maspro Denkoh, a developer of TV receiving equipment, from antennas and tuners to boosters, splitters, and beyond, even including cables, connectors, accessories, and security systems.

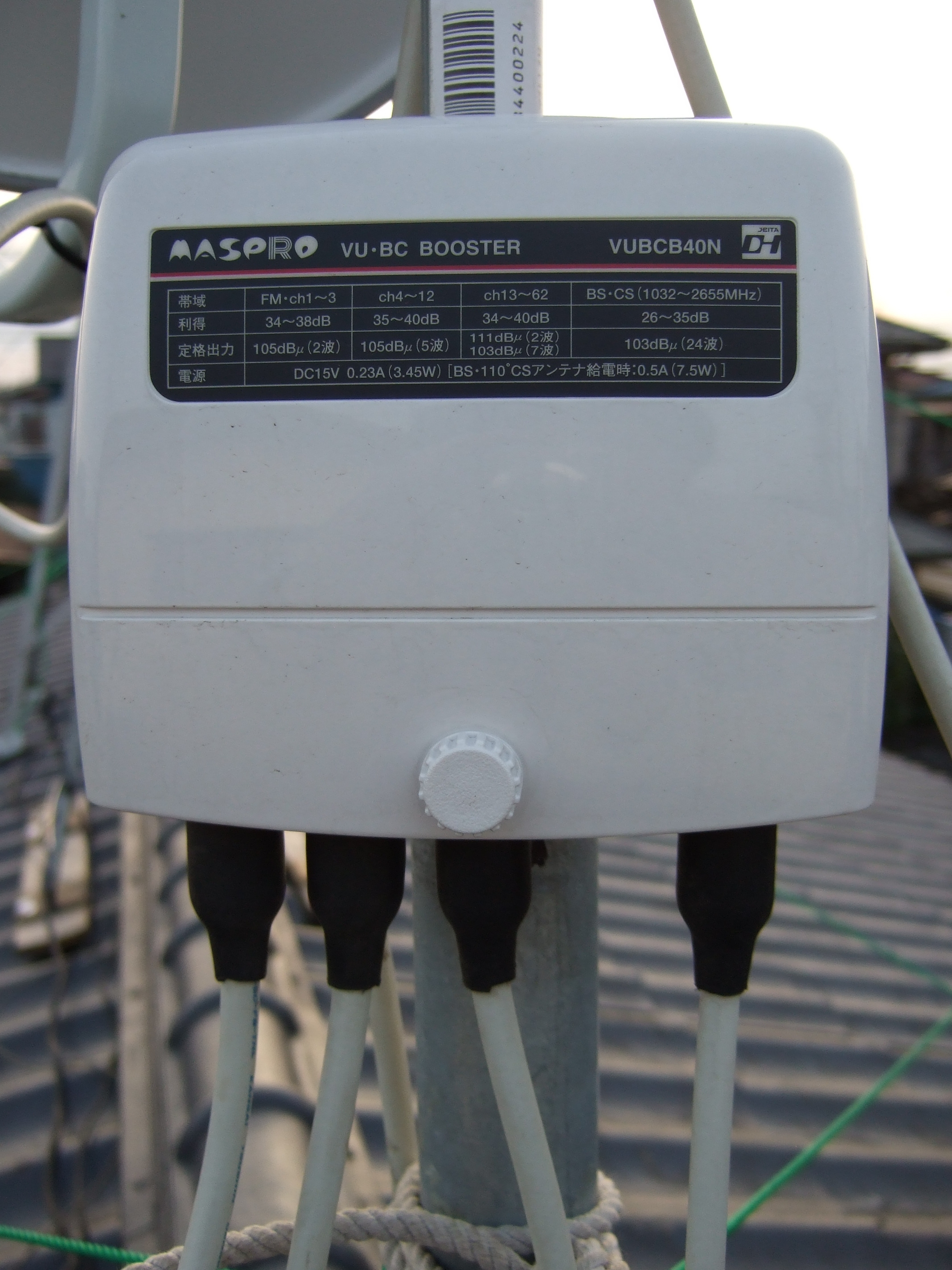
Maspro RF preamplifier
