= CD-i =

Interactive multimedia and video gaming standard

Compact Disc-Interactive

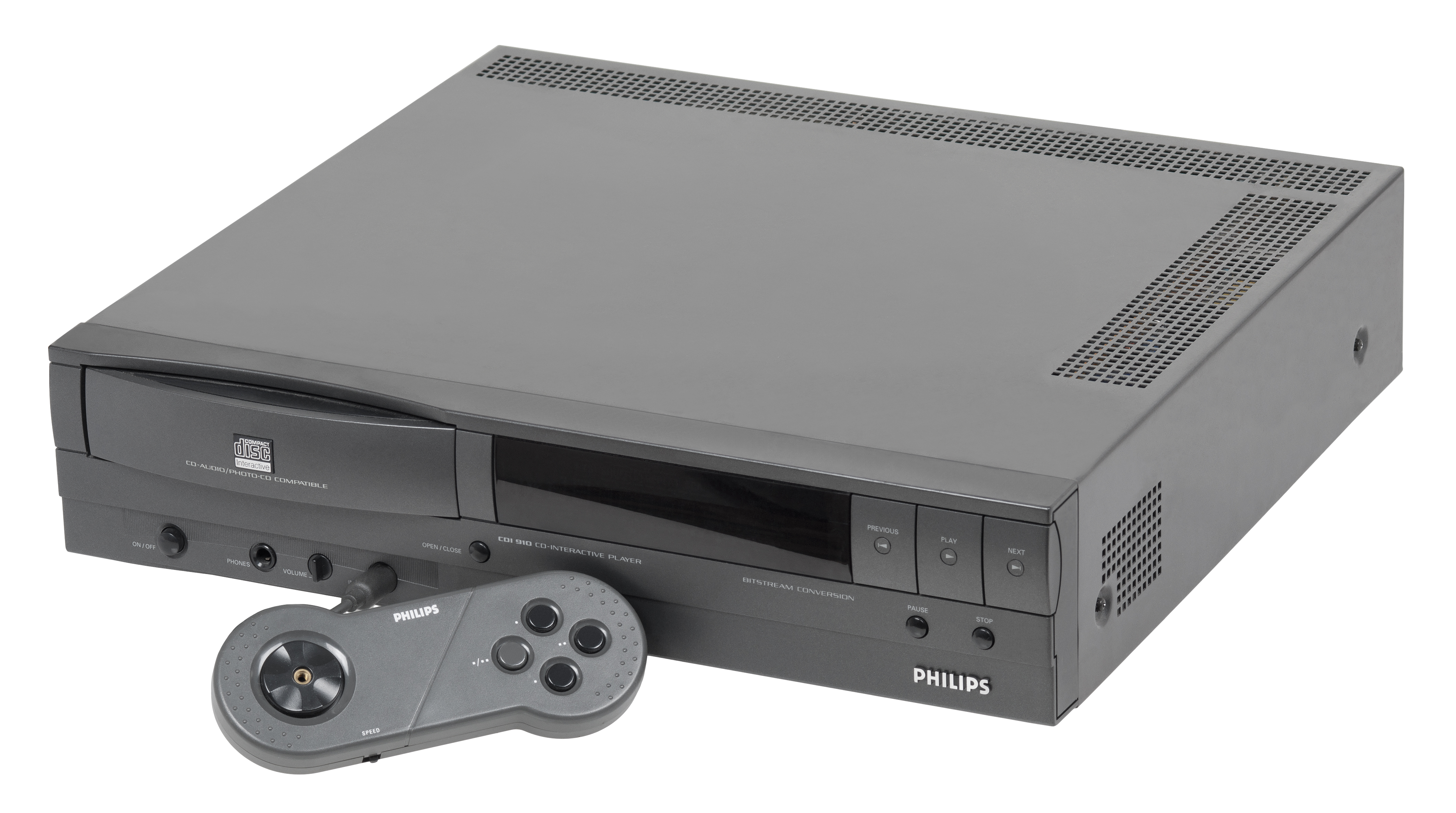
- Philips CDI 910, the first consumer-oriented CD-i player, pictured with its "Touchpad" game controller
- Media type: Optical disc
- Encoding: Various
- Capacity: Up to 744 MB
- Standard: Green Book
- Developed by: Philips, Sony
- Usage: Audio, video and data storage
- Extended from: Compact disc
- Released: 1990
- Discontinued: June 1999

The Compact Disc-Interactive (CD-I, later CD-i) is a digital optical disc data storage format as well as a hardware platform, co-developed and marketed by Dutch company Philips and Japanese company Sony. It was created as an extension of Compact Disc Digital Audio (CDDA) and CD-ROM and specified in the Green Book specifications, co-developed by Philips and Sony, to combine audio, text and graphics. The two companies initially expected to impact the education and training, point of sale, and home entertainment industries, but the CD-i was used more in the end for its video games.

CD-i media physically have the same dimensions as CD, but with up to 744 MB of digital data storage, including up to 72 minutes of full motion video. CD-i players were usually standalone boxes that connect to a standard television; some less common setups included integrated CD-i television sets and expansion modules for personal computers. Most players were created by Philips; the format was licensed by Philips and Microware for use by other manufacturers, notably Sony who released professional CD-i players under the "Intelligent Discman" brand. Unlike CD-ROM drives, CD-i players are complete computer systems centered around dedicated Motorola 68000-based microprocessors and its own operating system called CD-RTOS, which is an acronym for "Compact disc – Real Time Operating System".

Media released on the format included video games and "edutainment" and multimedia reference titles, such as interactive encyclopedias and museum tours – which were popular before public Internet access was widespread – as well as business software. Philips's CD-i system also implemented Internet features, including subscriptions, web browsing, downloading, e-mail, and online play. Philips's aim with its players was to introduce interactive multimedia content for the general public by combining features of a CD player and game console, but at a lower price than a personal computer with a CD-ROM drive.

Authoring kits for the format were released first in 1988, and the first player aimed for home consumers, Philips's CDI 910/205, was released in late 1991. It was initially priced around US$1,000 (equivalent to $2,364 in 2025), and was capable of playing interactive CD-i discs, Audio CDs, CD+G (CD+Graphics), Photo CDs and Video CDs (VCDs), though the latter required an optional "Digital Video Card" to provide MPEG-1 decoding. Initially marketed to consumers as "home entertainment systems", and in later years as a "gaming platform", CD-i did not manage to find enough success in the market, and was mostly abandoned by Philips in 1996. The format continued to be supported for licensees for a few more years after.

== Specifications ==
Development of the "Compact Disc-Interactive" format began in 1984 (two years after the launch of the Compact disc) and it was first publicly announced by Philips and Sony – two of the largest electronics companies of the time – at Microsoft's CD-ROM Conference in Seattle in March 1986. Microsoft's CEO Bill Gates had no idea beforehand that the format was under development. The Green Book, formally known as the "CD-i Full Functional Specification", defined the format for interactive, multimedia compact discs designed for CD-i players. The Green Book specification also defines a whole hardware set built around the Motorola 68000 microprocessor family, and an operating system called CD-RTOS based on OS-9, a product of Microware. The standard was originally not freely available and had to be licensed from Philips. However, the 1994 version of the standard was eventually made available free by Philips.

CD-i discs conform to the Red Book specification of audio CDs (CD-DA). Tracks on a CD-i's program area can be CD-DA tracks or CD-i tracks, but the first track must always be a CD-i track, and all CD-i tracks must be grouped together at the beginning of the area. CD-i tracks are structured according to the CD-ROM XA specification (using either Mode 2 Form 1 or Mode 2 Form 2 modes), and have different classes depending on their contents ("data", "video", "audio", "empty" and "message"). "Message" sectors contain audio data to warn users of CD players that the track they are trying to listen to is a CD-i track and not a CD-DA track. The CD-i specification also specifies a file system similar to (but not compatible with) ISO 9660 to be used on CD-i tracks, as well as certain specific files that are required to be present in a CD-i compatible disc. Compared to the Yellow Book (specification for CD-ROM), the Green Book CD-i standard solves synchronisation problems by interleaving audio and video information on a single track.

The format quickly gained interest from large manufacturers, and received backing from many particularly Matsushita. Although a joint effort, Philips eventually took over the majority of CD-i development at the expense of Sony. Philips invested many millions in developing titles and players based on the CD-i specification. Initially branded "CD-I", the name was changed in 1991 to "CD-i" with a lowercase i.

The CD-i Ready format is a type of bridge format, also designed by Philips, that defines discs compatible with CD Digital audio players and CD-i players. This format puts CD-i software and data into the pregap of Track 1.

The CD-i Bridge format, defined in Philips' White Book, is a transitional format allowing bridge discs to be played both on CD-ROM drives and on CD-i players.

The CD-i Digital Video format was launched in 1993 containing movies that could be played on CD-i players with a Digital Video Cartridge add-on. The format was incompatible with Video CD (VCD), although a CD-i unit with the DVC could play both formats. Only about 20 movies were released on the format and it was stopped in 1995 in favor of VCD.

== Commercial software ==
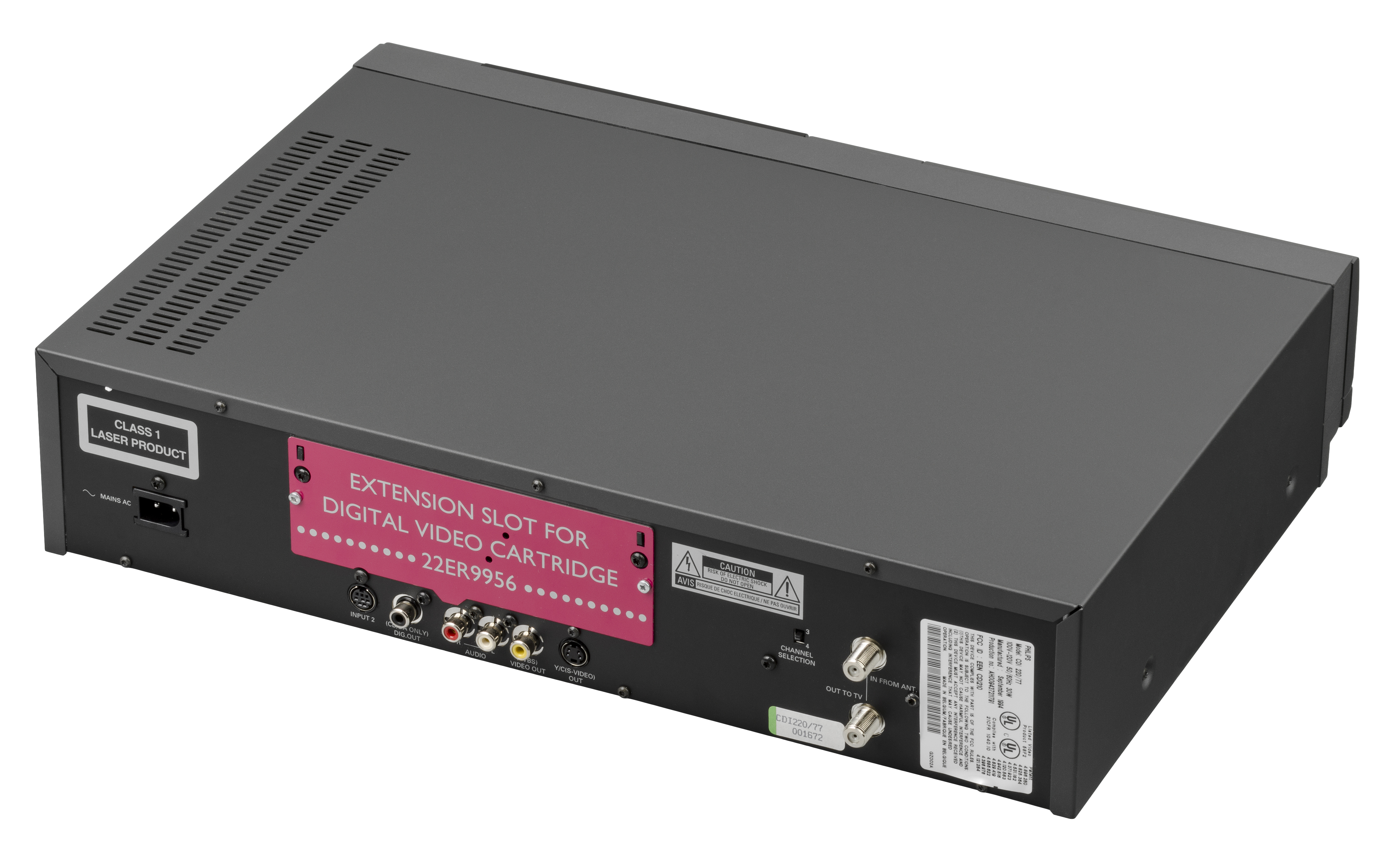
Some games required the optional MPEG cartridge, typically inserted into the back of the system (behind the red panel pictured)

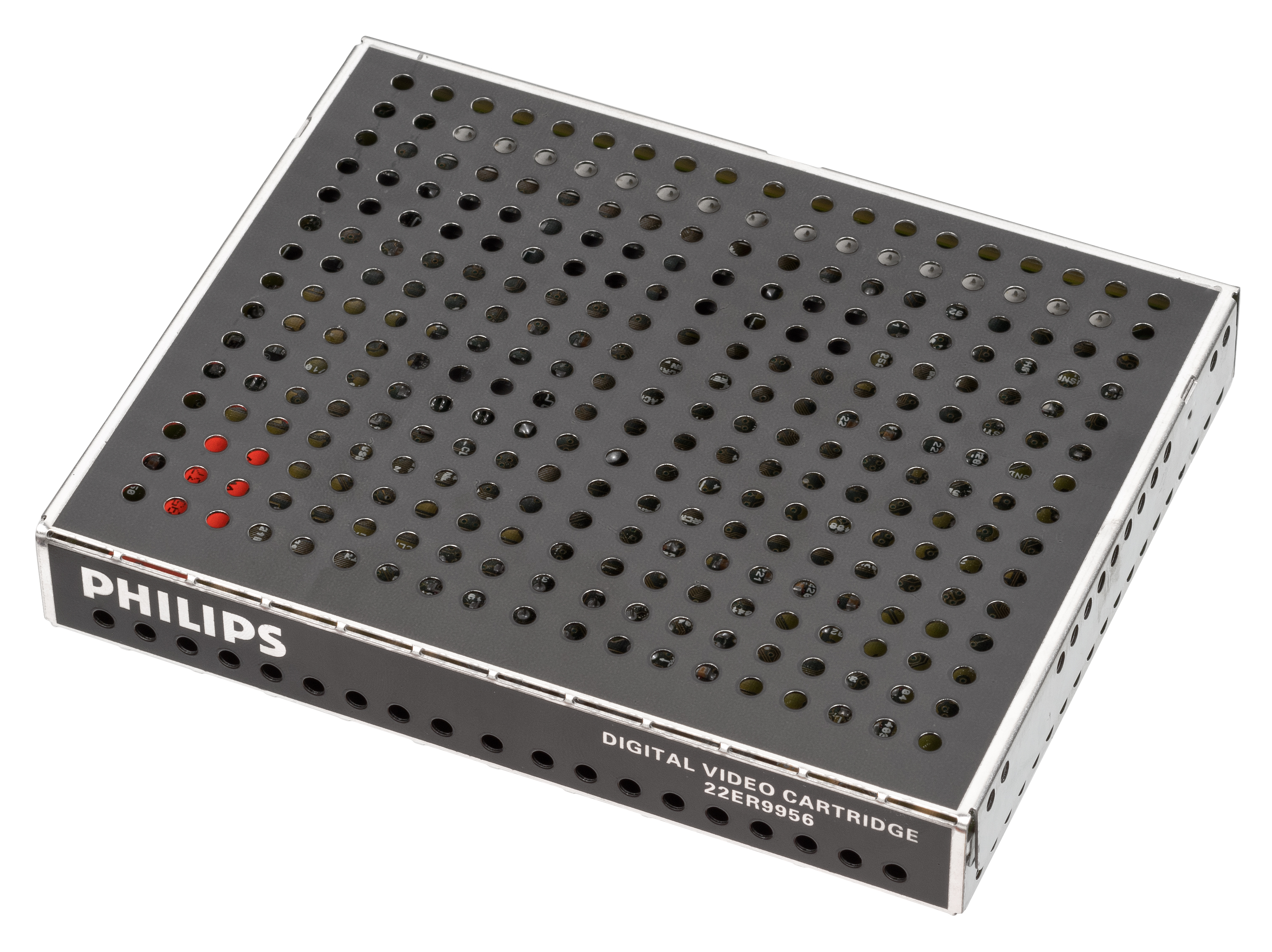
The optional MPEG cartridge, branded as the Digital Video Cartridge

CD-i software was typically developed using authoring tools from one of two companies: OptImage, which offered the Balboa Runtime Libraries and MediaMogul, and Script Systems, which produced ABCD-I. Much of the CD-i software was promoted or published by American Interactive Media (AIM), a joint venture between Philips and its subsidiary PolyGram, formed in Los Angeles in 1986 to publish CD-i consumer software. Philips Interactive Media was similarly launched in Europe.

Philips initially marketed CD-i as a family entertainment product and avoided emphasizing video games to prevent competition with game consoles. Early releases focused on educational, music, and self-improvement titles, with relatively few games, many of which were adaptations of board games such as Connect Four. However, the system struggled in the multimedia device market against low-cost PCs, and games became its best-selling software. By 1993, Philips encouraged MS-DOS and console developers to create games, introduced a $250 peripheral with expanded memory and full-motion video support, and added a second controller port to new consoles for multiplayer games.

Attempts to establish a foothold in the games market were largely unsuccessful, as the system, designed primarily as a multimedia player, was underpowered compared to other gaming platforms. Notable CD-i games included entries in Nintendo franchises, though not developed by Nintendo: Hotel Mario for the Mario franchise, and three titles for The Legend of Zelda: Zelda: The Wand of Gamelon, Link: The Faces of Evil, and Zelda's Adventure. These were made possible by an earlier agreement between Nintendo and Philips to develop a CD-based add-on for the Super Nintendo Entertainment System, which never progressed beyond the prototype stage. However, the agreement granted Philips the right to develop games using Nintendo characters.

As announced at CES 1992, numerous full-motion video titles appeared, including Dragon's Lair and Mad Dog McCree. One, Burn:Cycle, is considered one of the stronger CD-i titles and was later ported to PC. Electronic Gaming Monthly noted that CD-i’s full-motion video capabilities were its strongest feature; however, most titles required the MPEG upgrade card to take advantage of them.

Philips also released CD-i adaptations of TV game shows, including Jeopardy! (hosted by Alex Trebek), Name That Tune (hosted by Bob Goen), and two versions of The Joker's Wild (an adult version with Wink Martindale and a kids' version with Marc Summers). All North American CD-i games, except Name That Tune, feature Charlie O'Donnell as announcer. The Netherlands released its own version of Lingo in 1994.

In 1993, American musician Todd Rundgren created the first fully interactive music CD, No World Order, for CD-i, enabling over 15,000 points of customization. Dutch Eurodance duo 2 Unlimited released a CD-i compilation album, Beyond Limits (1994), featuring standard CD tracks and CD-i-exclusive media.

CD-i featured a range of children's edutainment titles, including Busytown and The Berenstain Bears. By mid-1996, the U.S. CD-i software market had dried up, though Philips continued publishing titles in Europe. Philips then shifted focus to kiosk and industrial multimedia applications.

In later years, homebrew developers released new CD-i titles, including Frog Feast (2005), Super Quartet (2018), and Nobelia (2022).

== Player models ==
CD-i compatible models were released in Belgium, Canada, France, Germany, Hong Kong, Luxembourg, the Netherlands, Japan, Singapore, the United Kingdom, the United States, and the former European Eastern Bloc. Shortly before it was discontinued, It was reported to be released further in Brazil, India and Australia in the "coming months", with plans to also introduce it in China, South Africa, Indonesia and the Philippines.

=== Philips models ===
Philips CD-i (200-700 series)

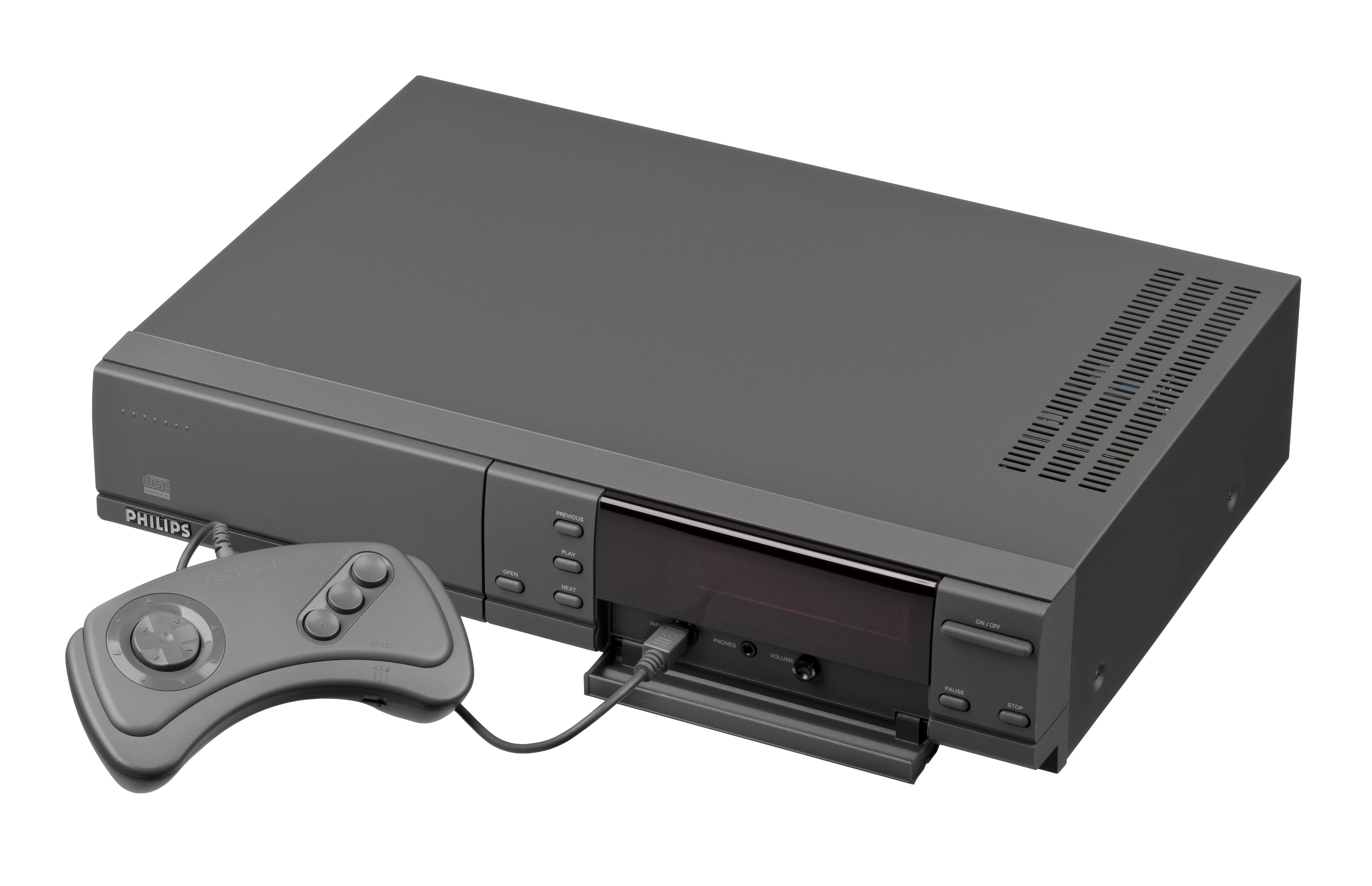
- Philips CDI 220, with its game controller
- Type: Home video game console Media player
- Generation: Fourth
- Released: NA: December 3, 1991; JP: April 25, 1992; EU: July 10, 1992
- Discontinued: WW: 1998
- Media: CD-i, Audio CD, CD+G, Karaoke CD, Video CD
- Operating system: CD-RTOS
- CPU: Philips SCC68070 @ 15.5 MHz
- Memory: 1 MB RAM
- Display: 384×280 to 768×560
- Graphics: Philips SCC66470, MCD 212
- Sound: MCD 221, ADPCM two channel sound
- Predecessor: Philips Videopac + G7400 (spiritual)

In addition to consumer models, professional and development CD-i players were marketed by Philips Interactive Media Systems and its VARs. The first CD-i system, developed in collaboration with Kyocera, was introduced in 1988 as the Philips 180/181/182 modular system. In the United States, many players were sold rebranded under the Magnavox name, a Philips subsidiary.

Philips released several CD-i player series, targeting different consumer and professional markets:

- 100 series: The modular 180/181/182 system, first demonstrated at the CD-ROM Conference in March 1988. Intended for professional use.
- 200 series: Consumer-oriented models including the 205, 210, and 220. Widely distributed through home electronics retailers. For the US market, the 205 was rebranded the 910 when released in December 1991. It initially retailed for about $799 (equivalent to $1,889 in 2025), reduced to $599 (equivalent to $1,374 in 2025) within a year.
- 300 series: Portable players such as the 310, 350, 360, and 370. Designed for professional applications and not marketed to consumers. Commonly used for multimedia sales presentations.
- 400 series: Budget-friendly models including the 450, 470, and 490, aimed at the console and educational markets. The CDI 450 was positioned as a gaming-oriented unit, sold without a standard infrared remote. This series debuted at the Consumer Electronics Show (CES) in Chicago in June 1994, with the 450 retailing for ƒ799 in the Netherlands.
- 500 series: Included the 550, functionally similar to the 450 but shipped with the normally optional MPEG cartridge video cartridge. Also introduced at CES Chicago in June 1994.
- 600 series: High-end professional models such as the 601, 602, 604, 605, 615, 660, and 670. Supported peripherals including floppy disk drives and keyboards, and were designed for software development and debugging.
- 700 series: Included the 740, a limited-release model with advanced features such as an RS-232 serial port.

Other CD-i-compatible systems included hybrid devices such as the FW380i, a mini-stereo system with a built-in CD-i player; the 21TCDi30, a television with integrated CD-i functionality; and the CD-i/PC 2.0, a CD-i module with an ISA interface for IBM-compatible 486 PCs.

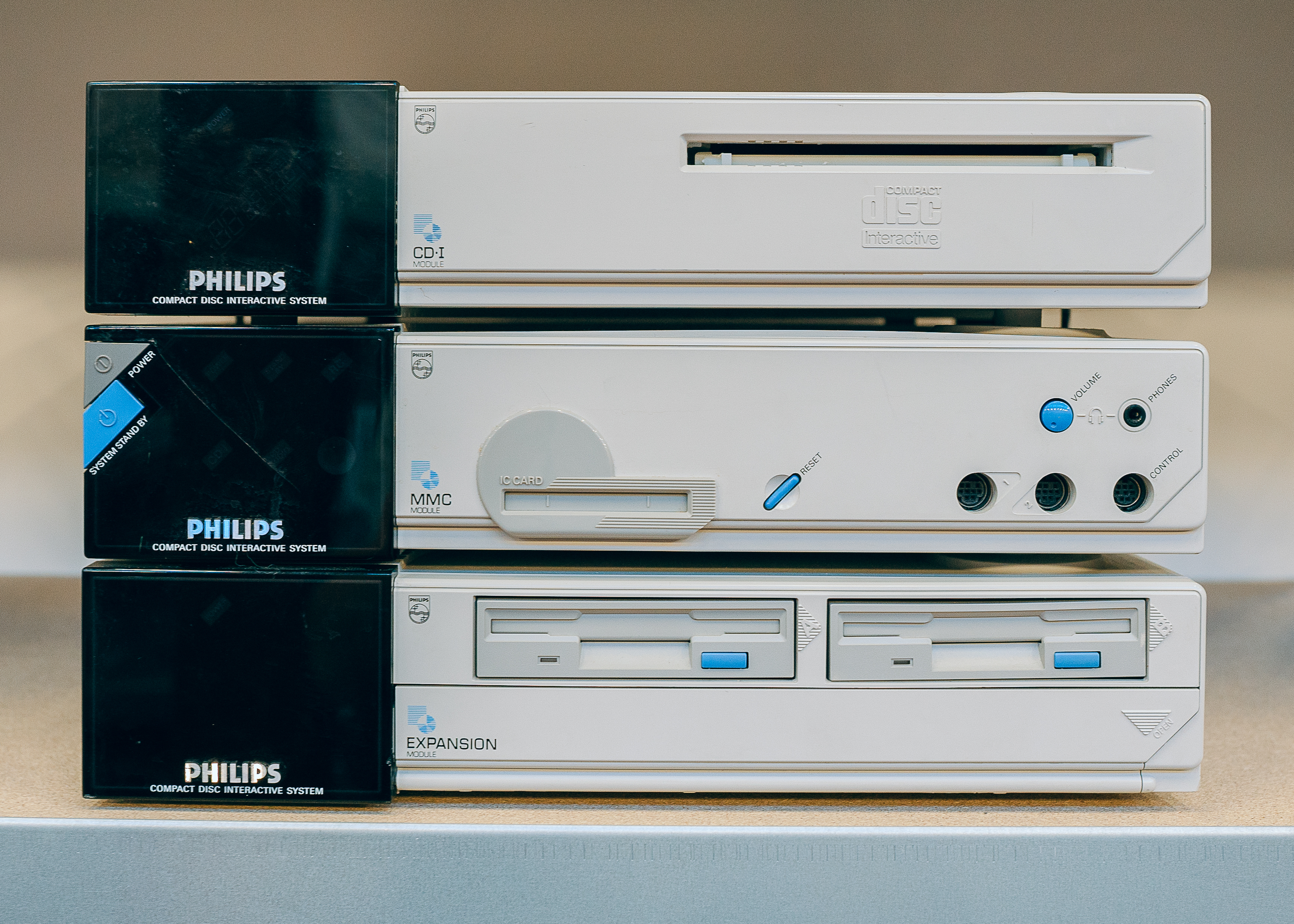
Three-unit 180/181/182 professional CD-i system

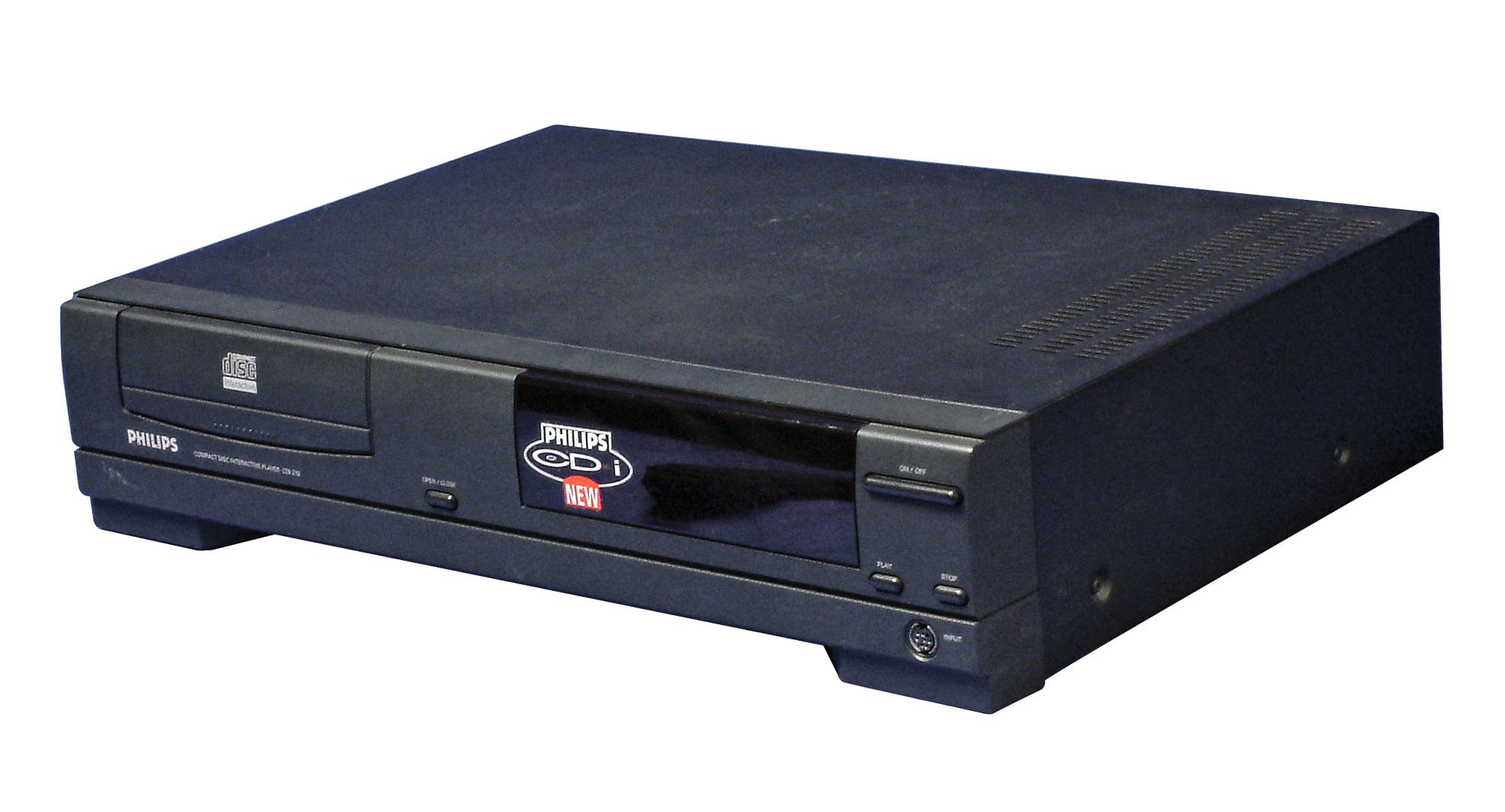
Philips CDI 210

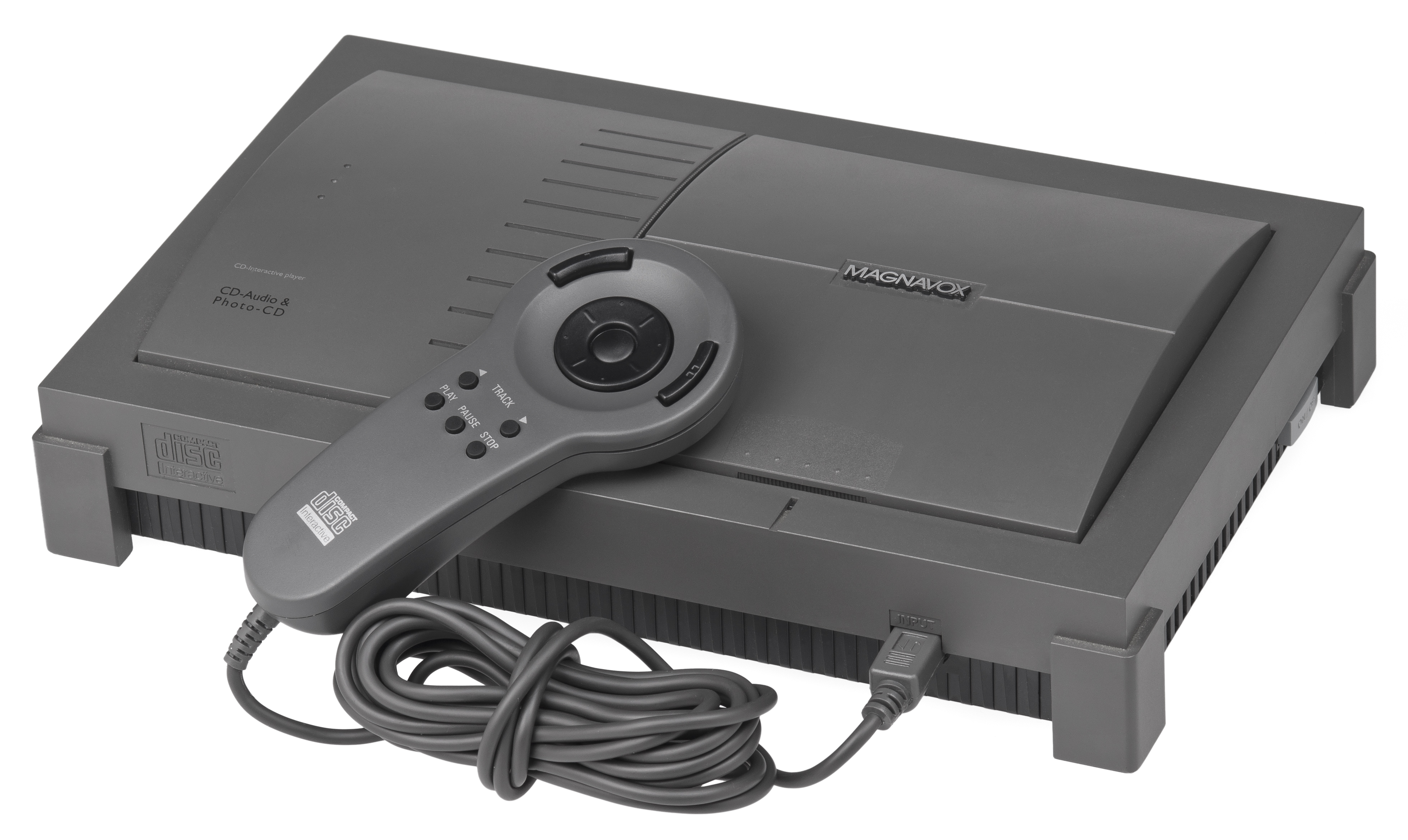
CDI 550 with its heavily criticized paddle controller

=== Other manufacturers ===
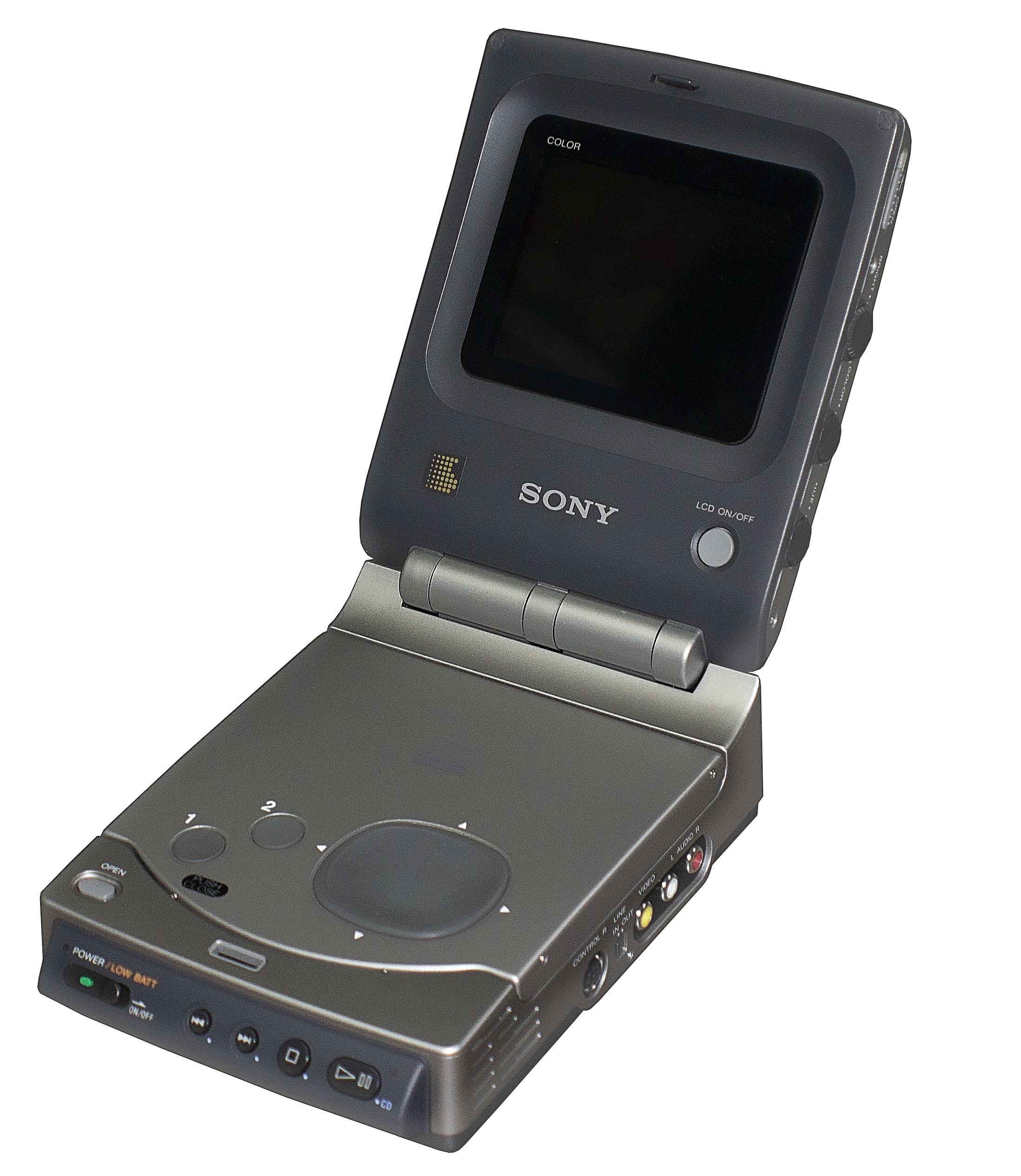
Sony CD-i Intelligent Discman IVO

In addition to Philips, several manufacturers produced CD-i players some of which were still on sale years after Philips itself abandoned the format. These included:

- Bang & Olufsen, which produced the BeoCenter AV5, a high-end television with a built-in CD-i player, available from 1997 to 2001.
- Digital Video Systems
- Grundig
- GoldStar (later LG Electronics), which released the GDI-700, a professional CD-i player featuring a Motorola 68341 processor, offering faster performance than Philips models. GoldStar also produced portable units, including a compact version without an LCD screen.
- International Interactive Media (I2m), which released a CD-i PCI expansion card in 1995 for use with 486 and Pentium PCs as well as 68k- and PowerPC-based Macintosh computers.
- Kyocera which manufactured the portable Pro 1000S model.
- Manna Space, a Japanese travel agency that released branded CD-i players based on the Magnavox or GoldStar versions of the Philips CDI 450, in 1995.
- Maspro Denkoh, which released a GPS car navigation system with an integrated CD-i player in Japan in 1992.
- Memorex
- Nippon Broadcasting System (NBS)
- Saab Electric
- Sony which released two CD-i models under the "Intelligent Discman" brand. These were portable players intended for professional use, and were released between 1990 and 1991.
- Vobis Highscreen

Before the commercial debut of the CD-i format, several other companies expressed interest in producing players or developed prototypes that were never released. These included Panasonic (originally a major backer of the format), Pioneer, JVC, Toshiba, Epson, Ricoh, Fujitsu, Samsung, and Yamaha. Additionally, Sanyo displayed a prototype portable CD-i player in 1992.

=== Hardware specifications ===
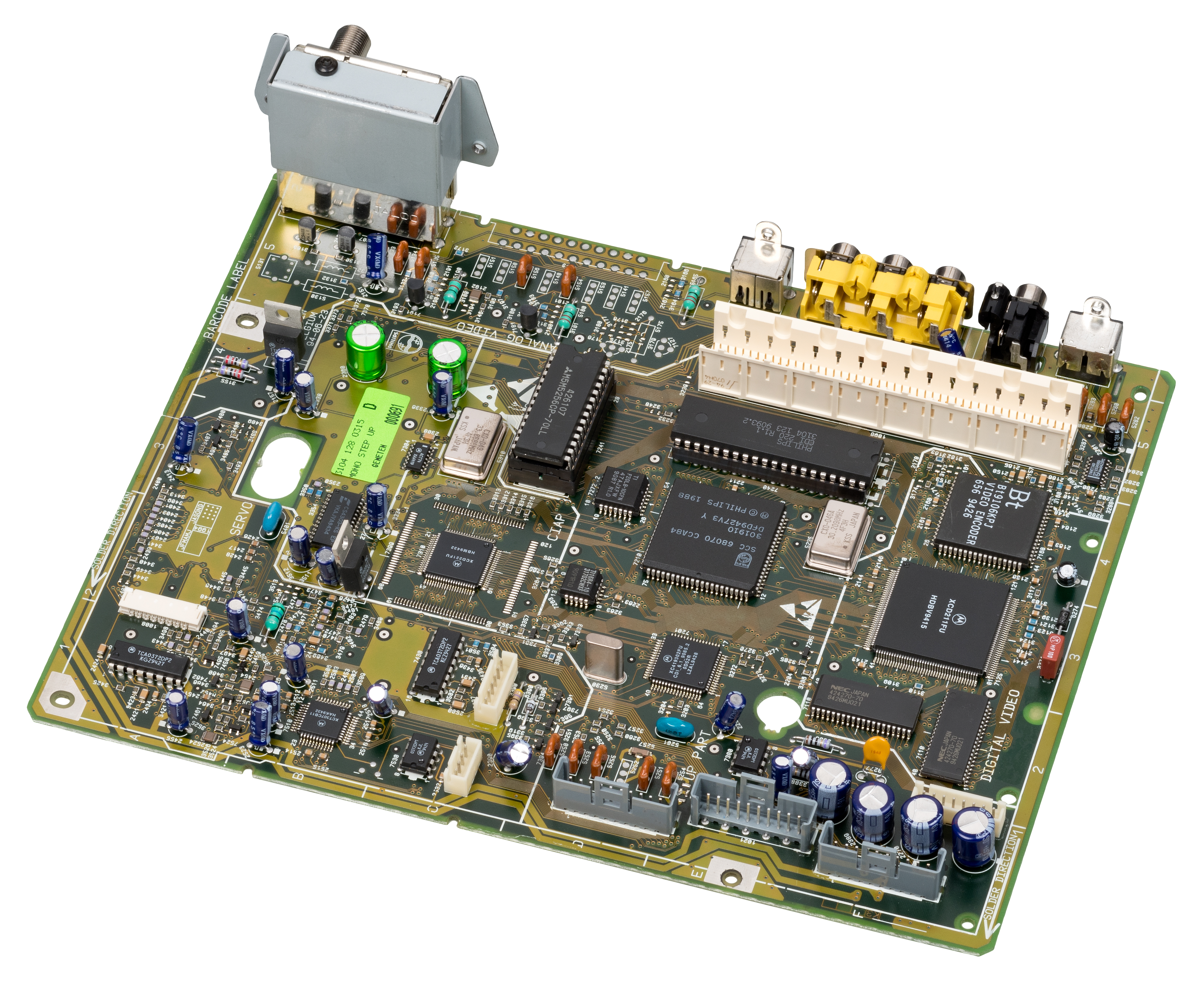
The motherboard of a CD-i 220

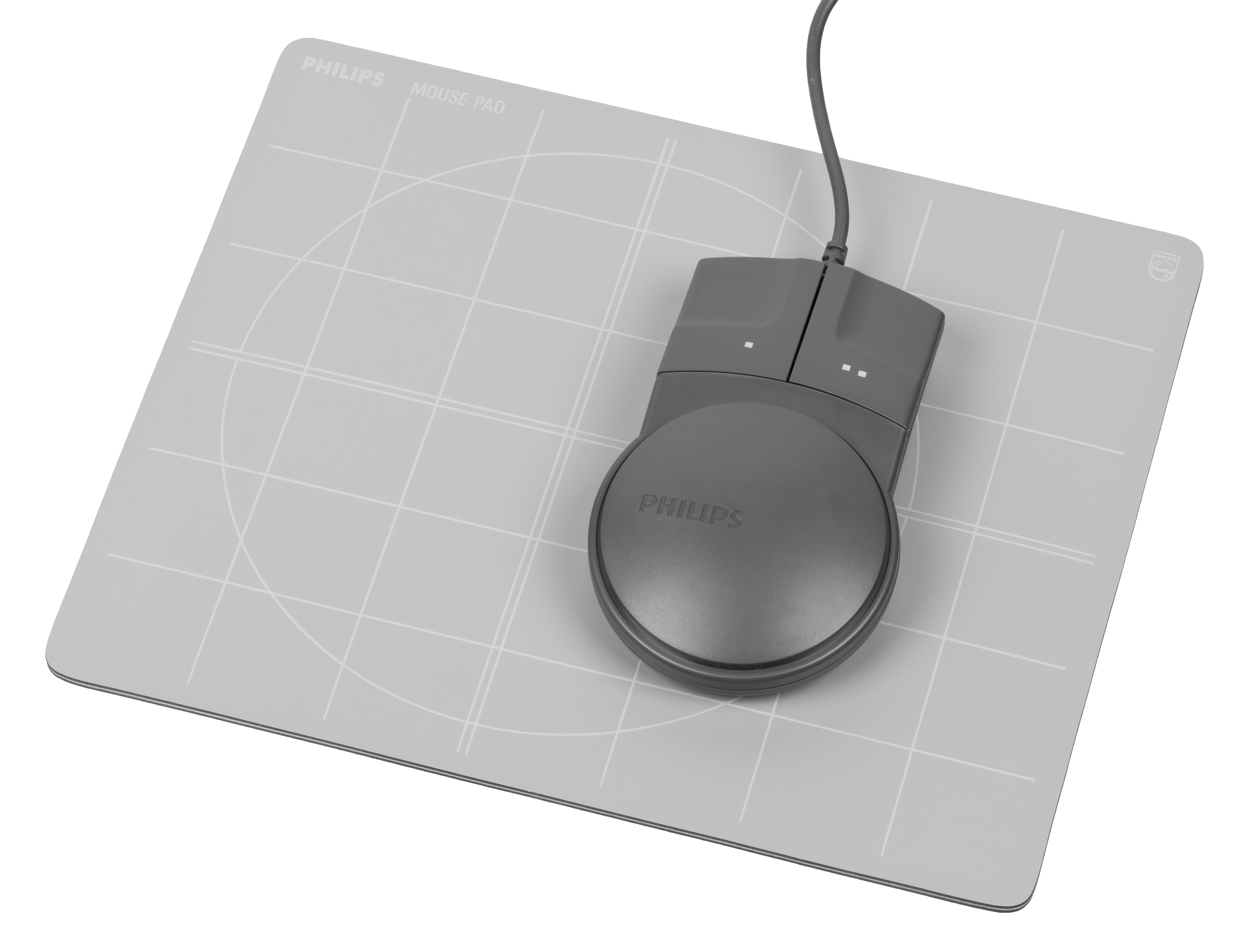
The CD-i Mouse, most commonly used for professional software

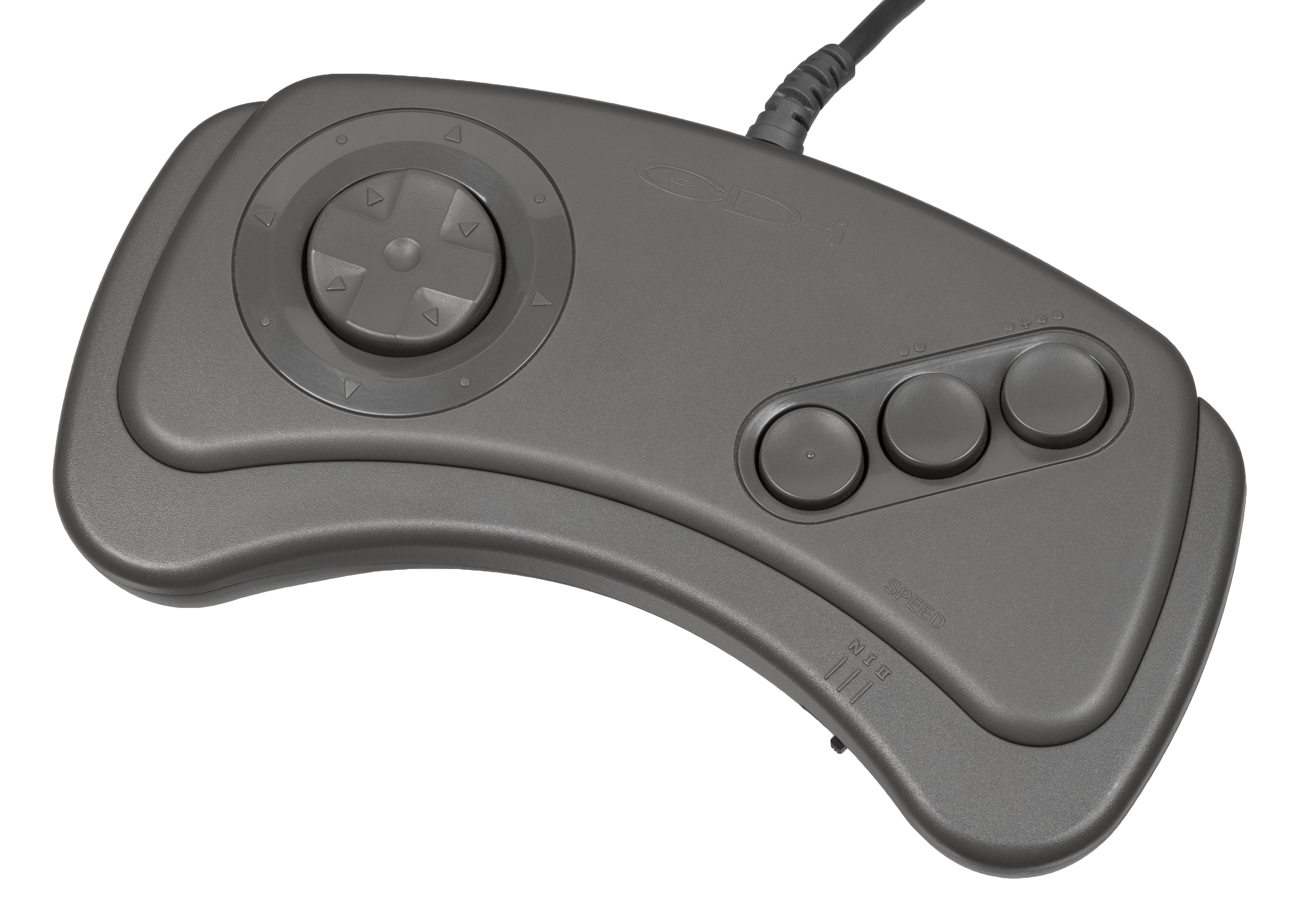
A CD-i gamepad controller, for more traditional CD-i games.

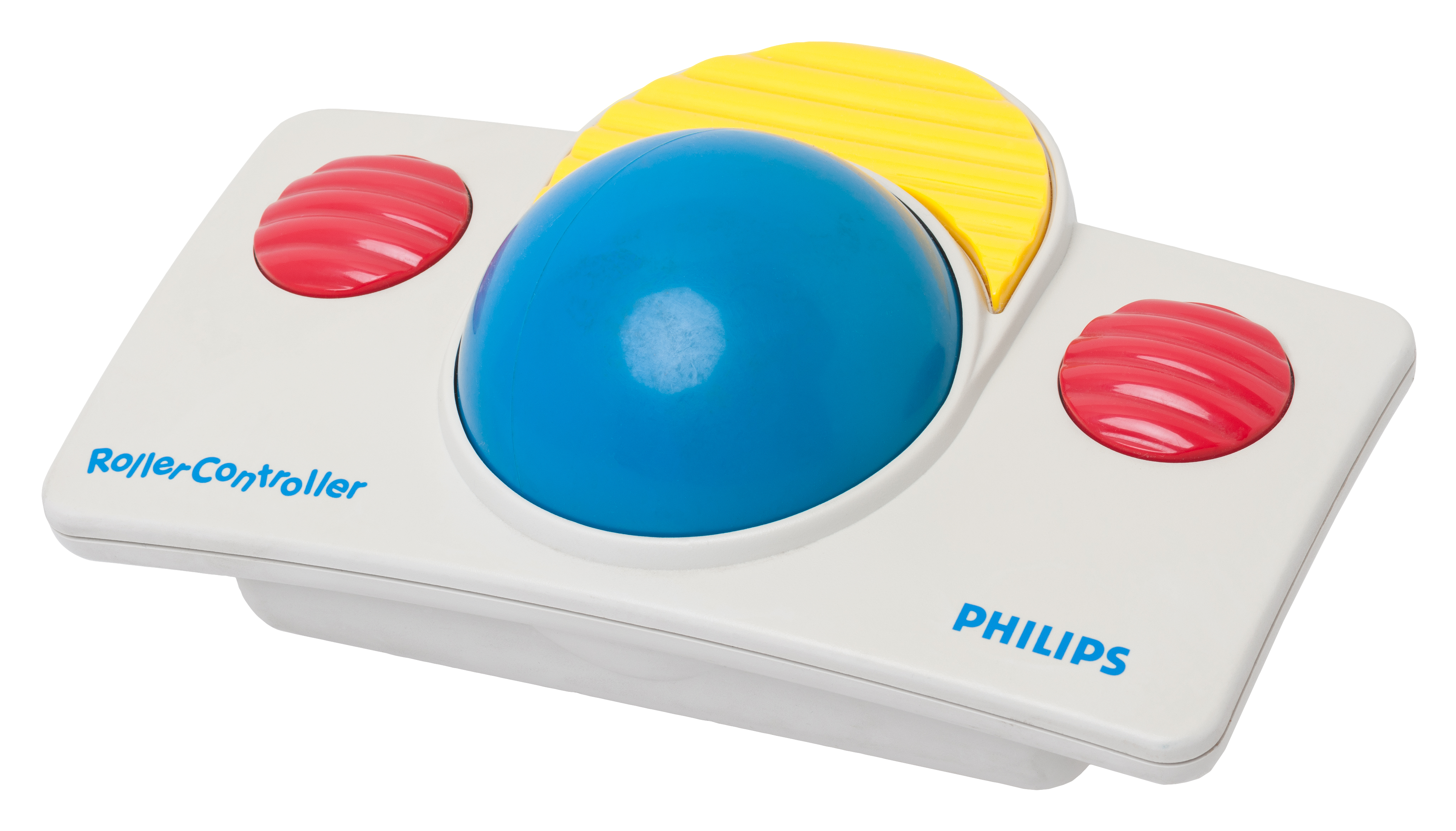
The CD-i "Roller" controller, specially designed for children

CPU
- 16/32-bit 68070 CISC Chip
- Clock Speed of 15.5 MHz

Display and video
- Graphics Chip: Philips semiconductors SCC66470 VSC (Video- and Systems Controller), later MCD 212
- Resolution: 256x224p to 512x480
- Colors: 16.7 million (24-bit true color) with 32,768 (16-bit High color) simultaneous on screen
- MPEG-1 Cartridge Plug-In for VideoCD and Digital Video
- Output encoding in NTSC or PAL
- SCART, RCA connector (Cinch-AV) and/or S-Video output (certain models)

Audio
- Sound Chip: MCD 221
- ADPCM 8-bit sound
- 16-bit stereo sound (up to 44.1 kHz sampling rate)
- RCA connectors (Cinch-AV) and electrical digital output (S/PDIF) (certain models)

Operating System
- CD-RTOS (based on Microware's OS-9)

Other
- 128 KB of main RAM
- Single speed CD-ROM drive
- RF modulator (certain models)

CD-i accessories
- CD-i mouse
- CD-I KeyControl (keyboard)
- Roller controller
- CD-i trackball
- I/O port splitter
- Touchpad controller (Gravis PC GamePad)
- Gamepad controller
- IR wireless controller
- RAM expansion and Video-CD (MPEG-1) support with DV Cart
- Peacekeeper Revolver

== TeleCD-i and CD-MATICS ==
Recognizing the growing need among marketers for networked multimedia, Philips partnered in 1992 with Amsterdam-based CDMATICS to develop TeleCD-i (also TeleCD). In this concept, the CD-i player is connected to a network such as PSTN or Internet, enabling data-communication and rich media presentation. Dutch grocery chain Albert Heijn and mail-order company Neckermann were early adopters and introduced award-winning TeleCD-i applications for their home-shopping and home-delivery services. CDMATICS also developed the special Philips TeleCD-i Assistant and a set of software tools to help the worldwide multimedia industry to develop and implement TeleCD-i. TeleCD-i is the world's first networked multimedia application at the time of its introduction. In 1996, Philips acquired source code rights from CDMATICS.

== CD-Online ==
E-mail screen of CD-Online UK

Internet services on the CD-i devices were facilitated by the use of an additional hardware modem and "CD-Online" disc (renamed Web-i in the US), which Philips initially released in Britain in 1995 for $150 US. This service provided the CD-i with full internet access (with a 14.4k modem), including online shopping, email, and support for networked multiplayer gaming on select CD-i games. The service required a CD-i player with DV cartridge, and an "Internet Starter Kit" which initially retailed for £99.99. It was advertised as bringing "full Internet access to the living room on TV screens". Andy Stout, a writer for the official CD-i magazine, explained CD-Online:

It is very much Internet-lite. The main advantages are that it's cheap - probably working out at a third of the cost of a PC or Mac solution - and incredibly user-friendly. The downside though is using a browser that doesn't support Netscape, and coping with all the drawbacks of the machine's minuscule memory - you can only ever access 10 articles on Usenet at a time, it'll only support 80 bookmarks maximum and for all that trouble all your saved games, preferences, and high scores will have been written over in RAM. ... It's got the full access right now but with only about 40% of the functionality, which will probably be fine for people who don't know what they're missing. But the virtual keyboard is a complete nightmare to use ...

The CD-Online service went live in the UK on October 25, 1995 and in March 1996 in the Netherlands (for 399 guilders), and also released in Belgium. The system was reportedly scheduled to launch in the US as "Web-i" in August 1996. The domain cd-online.co.uk, which was used for the British CD-Online service, went offline in 2000. The Dutch domain cd-online.nl stopped updating too but remained online until 2007.

Only one game was released that supported CD-Online, the first-person shooter game RAM Raid. Players from any country in the world could compete against each other as long as they had a copy of the game.

== Reception and market performance ==
Philips had invested heavily in the CD-i format and system, and it was often compared with the Commodore CDTV as a single combination of computer, CD, and television. The product was touted as a single machine for home entertainment connected to a standard TV and controlled by a regular remote control – although the format was noted to have various non-entertainment business opportunities too, such as travel and tourism or the military. In 1990, Peugeot used CD-i for its point of sale application promoting its then-new 605 automobile, and it was also at the time used by fellow car manufacturer Renault for staff training programmes, and in Japan by the Ministry of Trade and Industry for an exhibition there. A Philips executive, Gaston Bastiaens, quoted in 1990 "CD-I will be 'the medium' for entertainment, education and information in the 90's.". Sony introduced its three portable CD-i players in June 1990, pitching them as "picture books with sound".

The ambitious CD-i format had initially created much interest after its 1986 announcement, both in the west and in Japan, buoyed by the success of the CD. However, after repeated delays (hardware was first intended to be ready and shipped by Christmas 1987) interest was slowly lost. Electronic Arts for instance was enthusiastic about CD-i and formed a division for the development of video game titles on the format, but it was eventually halted with the intention of resuming when CD-i players would reach the market. The company eventually never resumed CD-i software development when it was released. The delay also gave more attention to the hyped Digital Video Interactive (DVI) in 1987, which demonstrated full screen, full motion video (FMV) using a compression chip on an IBM PC/AT computer. Amid the attention around its potential rival DVI, Philips and Sony decided to find a way to add full screen FMV abilities to the CD-i standard, causing further delay. Meanwhile, the Microsoft-backed CD-ROM standard was improving and solved certain video playback issues that were present on the CD-i – CD-ROM format products were already on the market by 1987. At the end, CD-ROM standard benefited from the CD-i and DVI mishaps, and by the time CD-i players for consumers were released in 1991, CD-ROM had already become known and established. Ron Gilbert commented in early 1990 "The CD-I specifications look great, but where are the machines? If they'd come out four years ago, they'd have been hot, but now they're behind the times." Another reason that led to fading interest pre-launch was the fact CD-i players would not launch with FMV but instead receive it later through a purchasable add-on cartridge (it was originally expected to come built-in) – as well as the obsolete Motorola processor, OS-9 software, and a launch price considered high.

Although Philips had aggressively promoted their CD-i products in the U.S., by August 1993 Computer Gaming World reported that "skepticism persists about its long-term prospects" compared to other platforms like IBM PC compatibles, Apple Macintosh, and Sega Genesis. The magazine stated in January 1994 that despite Philips' new emphasis on games "CD-i is still not the answer for hardcore gamers", but the console "may yet surprise us all in the future". It recommended the CD-i with video cartridge for those needing to buy a new console as "The price is right and there is more software to support it", but 3DO Interactive Multiplayer was probably better for those who could wait a few months. The Electronic Entertainment August 1994 issue noted that the CD-i, along with the Atari Jaguar, neither have an "effective, let alone innovative" game library to compete against the then newly released Sega CD.

After being outsold in the market by cheaper multimedia PCs, in 1994 Philips attempted to emphasize CD-i as a game playing machine, but this did not help the situation. An early 1995 review of the system in GamePro stated that "inconsistent game quality puts the CD-i at a disadvantage against other high-powered game producers." A late 1995 review in Next Generation criticized both Philips's approach to marketing the CD-i and the hardware itself ("The unit excels at practically nothing except FMV, and then only with the addition of a $200 digital video cartridge"). The magazine noted that while Philips had not yet officially discontinued the CD-i, it was dead for all intents and purposes, citing as evidence the fact that though Philips had a large booth at the 1995 Electronic Entertainment Expo, there was no CD-i hardware or software on display. Next Generation scored the console one out of five stars. Another trouble for Philips in 1995 was the formation of DVD-Video, which promised better quality video compared to Video CD's (VCD) MPEG-1 compression method – Philips had heavily promoted the CD-i's VCD playing capabilities. Philips Media consolidated its CD-i activities from its Los Angeles office in March 1996. It was reported in October 1996 that Philips was ready to "call it quits" in the American market.

=== Sales ===
In October 1994, Philips claimed an installed base of 570,000 units for the CD-i worldwide. In 1996, The Wall Street Journal reported that total US sales amounted to 400,000 units. In the Netherlands, about 60,000 CD-i players were sold by the end of December 1994.

=== Legacy ===
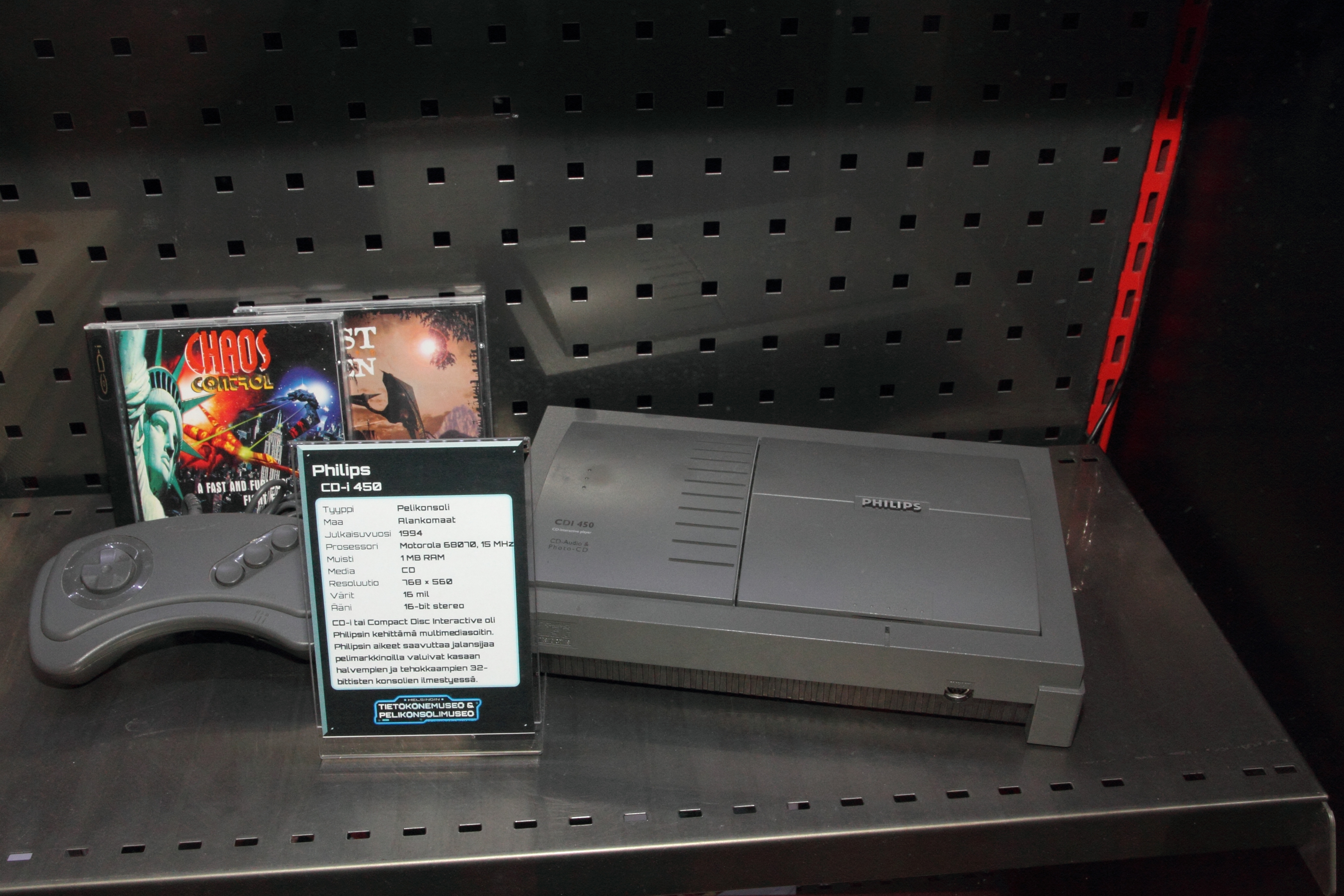
The Philips CD-i 450 console at the Computer and Video Game Console Museum of Helsinki in 2012

Although extensively marketed by Philips, particularly via infomercial, consumer interest in CD-i titles remained low. By 1994, sales of CD-i systems had begun to slow, and in 1998 the product line was dropped. Plans for a second generation CD-i system were made, and Argonaut Software was designated to design chip sets for the successor to the CD-i. However, company president Cor Boonstra saw no interest in the media area for Philips and so Philips sold everything, including the media subsidiary Polygram.

The Dutch half of Philips Media was sold to Softmachine, which released The Lost Ride on the CD-i as the last product for the CD-i. The French side of the company, who had purchased German publishers Bomico Entertainment Software and Laguna Video Games the year prior, was sold to French publisher Infogrames in June 1997 along with the entire CD-i library as well as German publishers. A CD-ROM add-on for the Super NES, which was announced for development with Nintendo in 1991, was never made. The last CD-i game was Solar Crusade, made by Infogrames and released in 1999.

After its discontinuation, the CD-i was overwhelmingly panned by critics who blasted its graphics, games, and controls. Microsoft CEO Bill Gates admitted that initially he "was worried" about the CD-i due to Philips' heavy support for the device and its two-pronged attack on both the games console and PC markets, but that in retrospect, "It was a device that kind of basically got caught in the middle. It was a terrible game machine, and it was a terrible PC." The CD-i's various controllers were ranked the fifth worst video game controller by IGN editor Craig Harris. PC World ranked it as fourth on their list of "The 10 Worst Video Game Systems of All Time". Gamepro.com listed it as number four on their list of The 10 Worst-Selling Consoles of All Time. In 2008, CNET listed the system on its list of the worst game console(s) ever. In 2007, GameTrailers ranked the Philips CD-i as the fourth worst console of all time in its Top 10 Worst Console lineup.

In later years, video games released for the CD-i have been criticised, particularly those from the Nintendo-licensed Mario and The Legend of Zelda series, considered by many to be of poor quality. Games that were most heavily criticized include Hotel Mario, Link: The Faces of Evil, Zelda: The Wand of Gamelon, and Zelda's Adventure. EGM's Seanbaby rated The Wand of Gamelon as one of the worst video games of all time. However, Burn:Cycle was positively received by critics and has often been held up as the standout title for the CD-i.

== See also ==
- CD-i Ready
- High Sierra Format
- 3DO Interactive Multiplayer
- MiniDisc
- CD-ROM
- Video CD
- Super NES CD-ROM
- Digital Video Interactive
- Commodore CDTV
- Pioneer LaserActive
- Sega CD
- FM Towns
- Tandy Video Information System
- NEC TurboDuo
