= Discman =

Sony's portable CD player

Discman logo used by Sony until 2000.

CD Walkman logo used from 1997 until 2000. Later Sony models bear the Walkman logo. Walkman is a Sony exclusive naming.

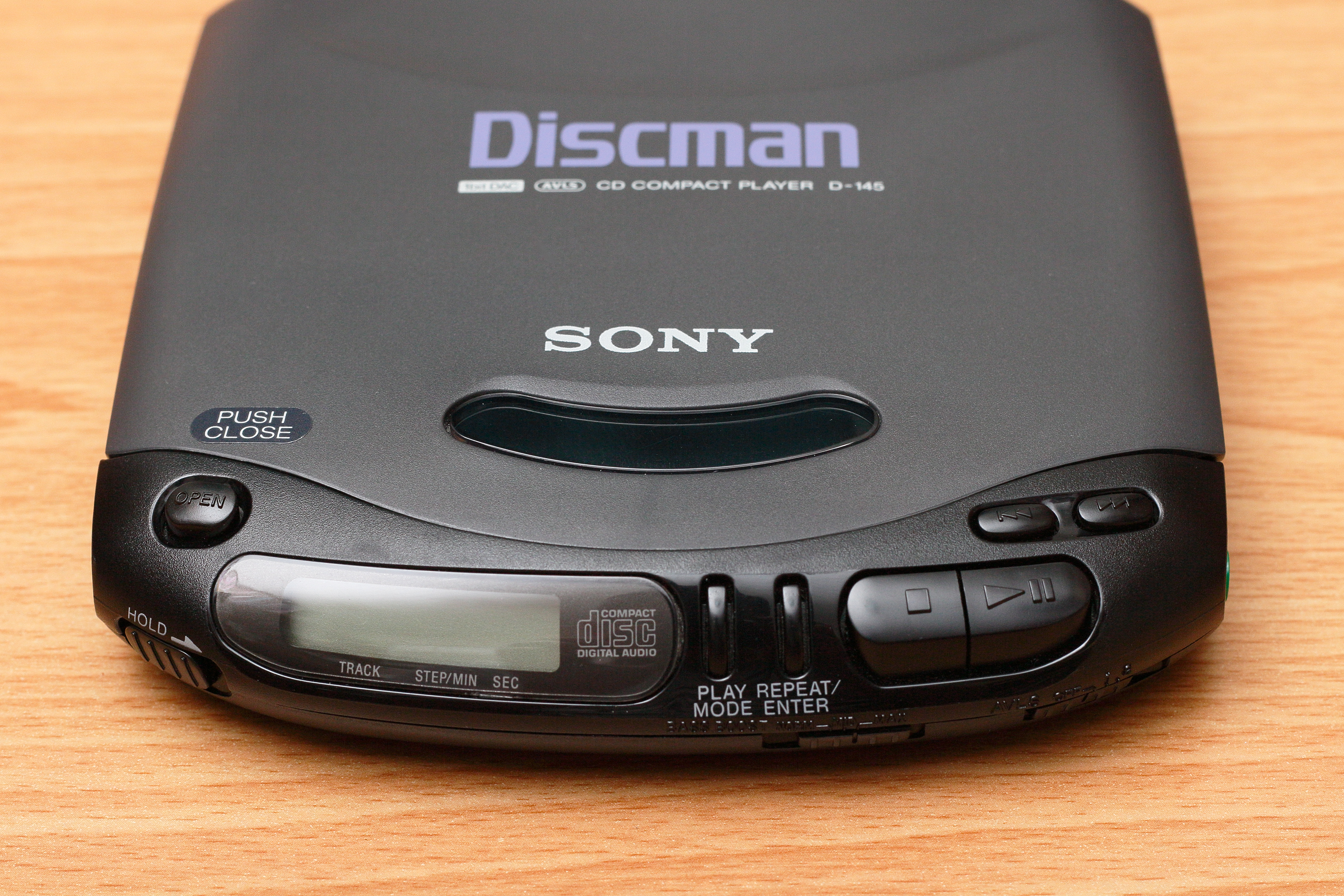
Discman D-145 (1995)

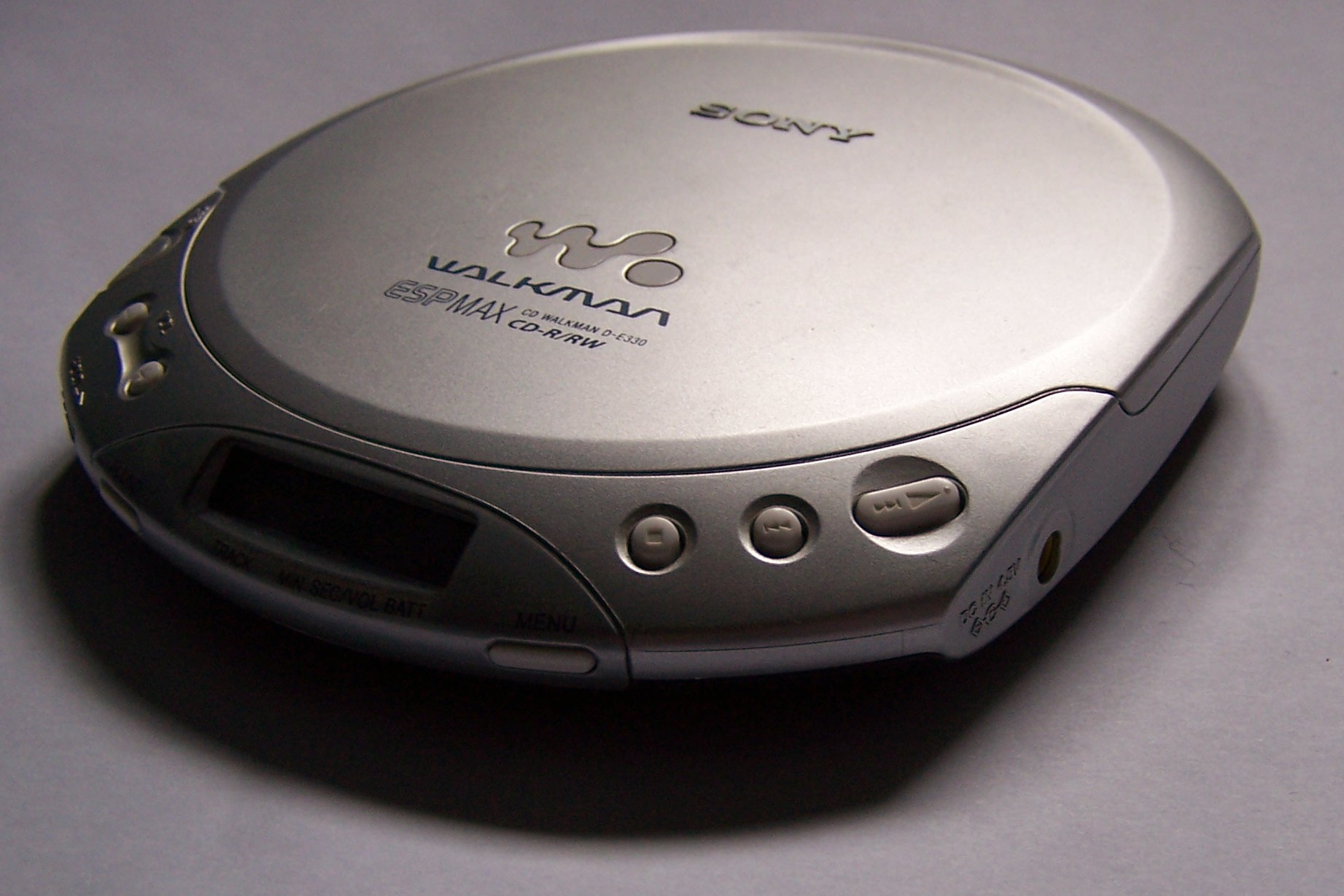
CD Walkman D-E330 (2002), with Walkman logo

Discman (Japanese: ディスクマン, Hepburn: Disukuman) was a brand name used by Sony for their portable CD players. The first Discman, the Sony D-50 or D-5 (depending on region), was launched in 1984. The Sony brand name for Discman changed to CD Walkman, (Note: CD ウォークマン (CD Wōkuman)) initially for Japanese lineups launched between October 1997 and March 1998, and then entirely in 2000. Discman and CD Walkman players were discontinued at the beginning of the 2010s, when they lost popularity with the general public.

== Background ==
Prior to the development of the compact disc, cassette tapes were the dominant form of audio storage in the then-fledgling portable audio industry. In 1979, Sony introduced the Walkman in Japan. When Sony realized the potential of the CD, the Walkman was promoted to mainstream buyers.

== Original development ==
Sony improved the design of the CDP-101 CD player which was launched in 1982, reducing the power consumption and the number of parts needed and making it smaller. The cost was reduced to between 50,000 and 60,000 yen, in what was called the "CD CD Project", which stood for the 'Compact Disc Cost Down' Project. By August 1983 the company was able to produce a CD player which was one-tenth the size of the original, and a portable CD player became a possibility. The aim was to create a player that was the same size as four CD cases stacked on top of each other. A piece of wood 13.4 cm across and about 4 cm thick was shown to the staff to illustrate the dimensions.

The final design did not incorporate a power source and had a 9-volt (positive outer) coaxial jack on the rear. This allowed the use of an EBP-9LC wall adapter, a carrying sleeve which held six primary C cells, or rechargeable cells which could be charged in situ. The AC-D50 AC adapter was also available, which attached to the rear of the D-50/D-5 and allowed it to be powered from AC input at 110, 120, 220, or 240 V, 50 or 60 Hz, 9 W with a DC output of up to 500 mA. The AC-D50 also offered line level audio out, presented as two RCA jacks.

=== Release ===
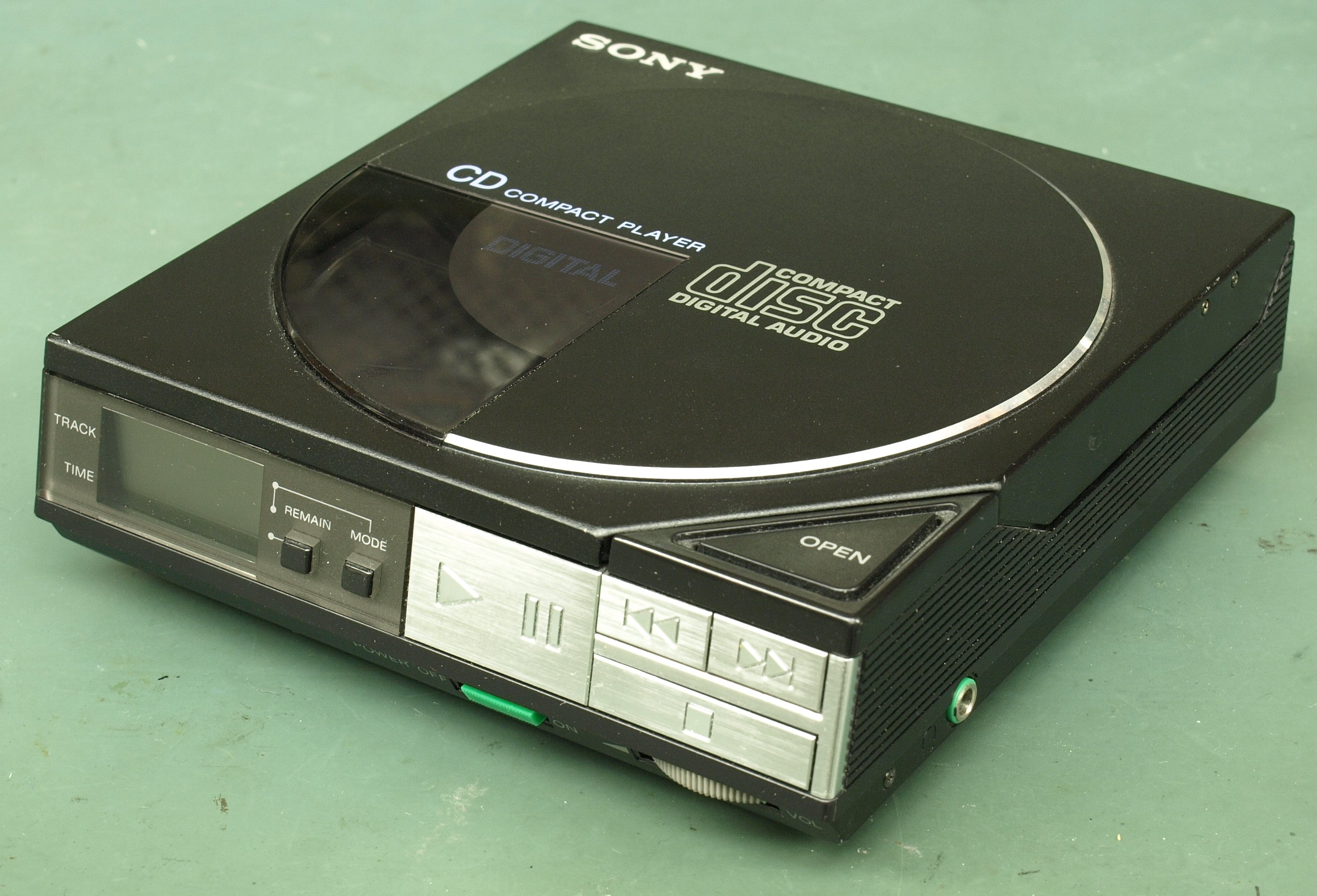
Sony D-50/D-5 Discman

The D-50/D-5 was launched in November 1984, two years after mass production of CDs began. The unit offered the same functions as the full-size CDP-101 player, but came without a remote control and the repeat function of the full-size unit. The D-50/D-5 retailed for 49,800 yen (US$350 in 1984), approximately half the price of the CDP-101. The D-50/D-5 sparked public interest in CDs, boosting their popularity, and within a year and a half had become profitable.

Early production units of the D-50/D-5 did not carry the Discman brand and were instead referred to as "CD Compact Player". The Discman brand was applied later because of the unit's portability and similarity to the cassette Walkman. This brand name was used for Sony's portable CD players until 2000.

=== Impact ===
The release of the D-50/D-5 sparked public interest in CDs as an audio format, and in the audio industry in general. A portable CD market was created and the price of competing CD players from other manufacturers dropped. The CD industry experienced sudden growth, with the number of CD titles available dramatically increasing.

== Variants ==
=== ATRAC CD Walkman ===
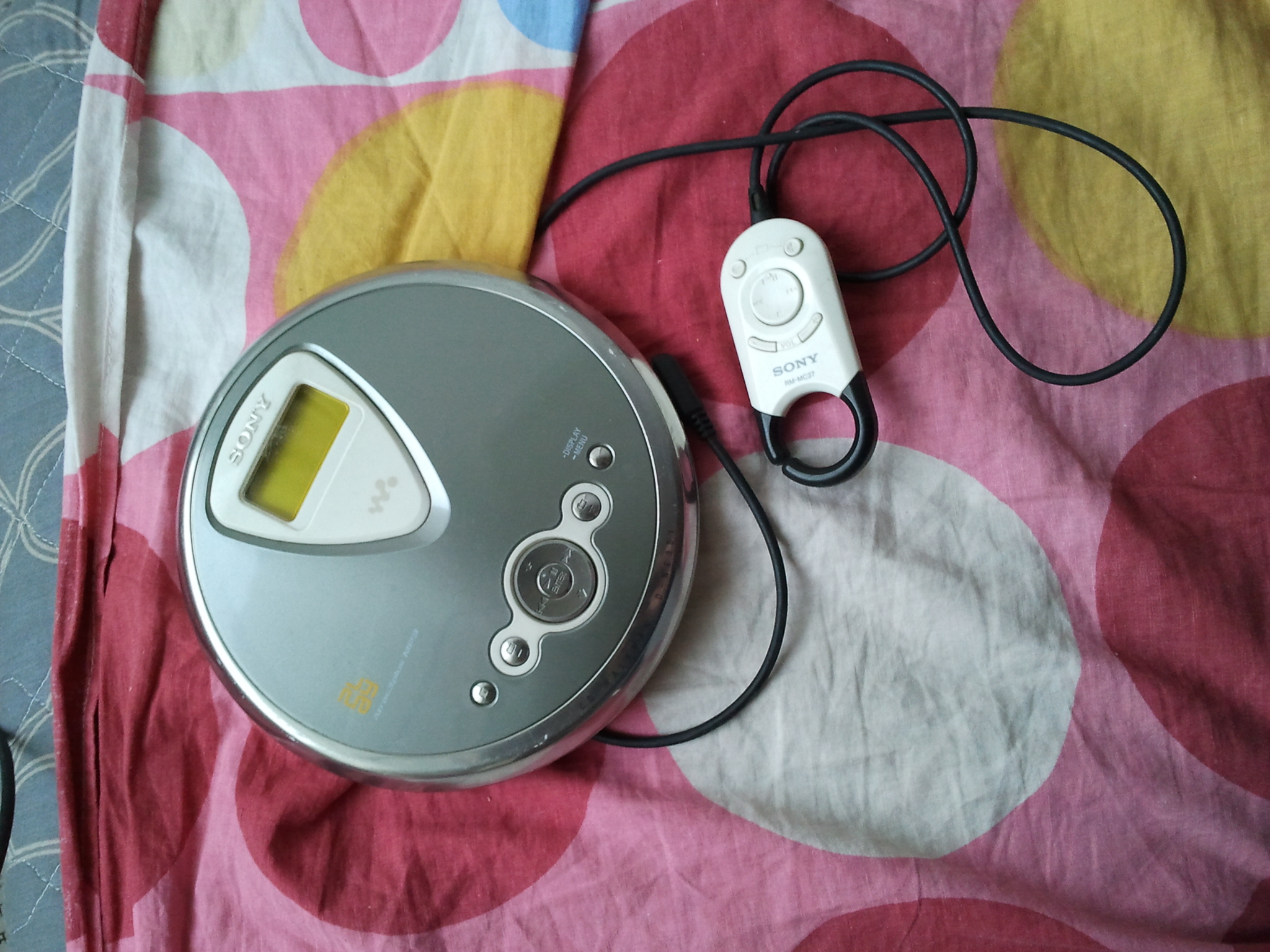
ATRAC CD Walkman D-NE301 with remote (2004).

The ATRAC CD Walkman played ATRAC CDs in addition to audio CDs. The ATRAC CD contained audio encoded in ATRAC3 or ATRAC3plus. Most, if not all, models also played MP3s. The D-NE1 from 2003 was one of the earliest models.

=== Video CD Discman ===
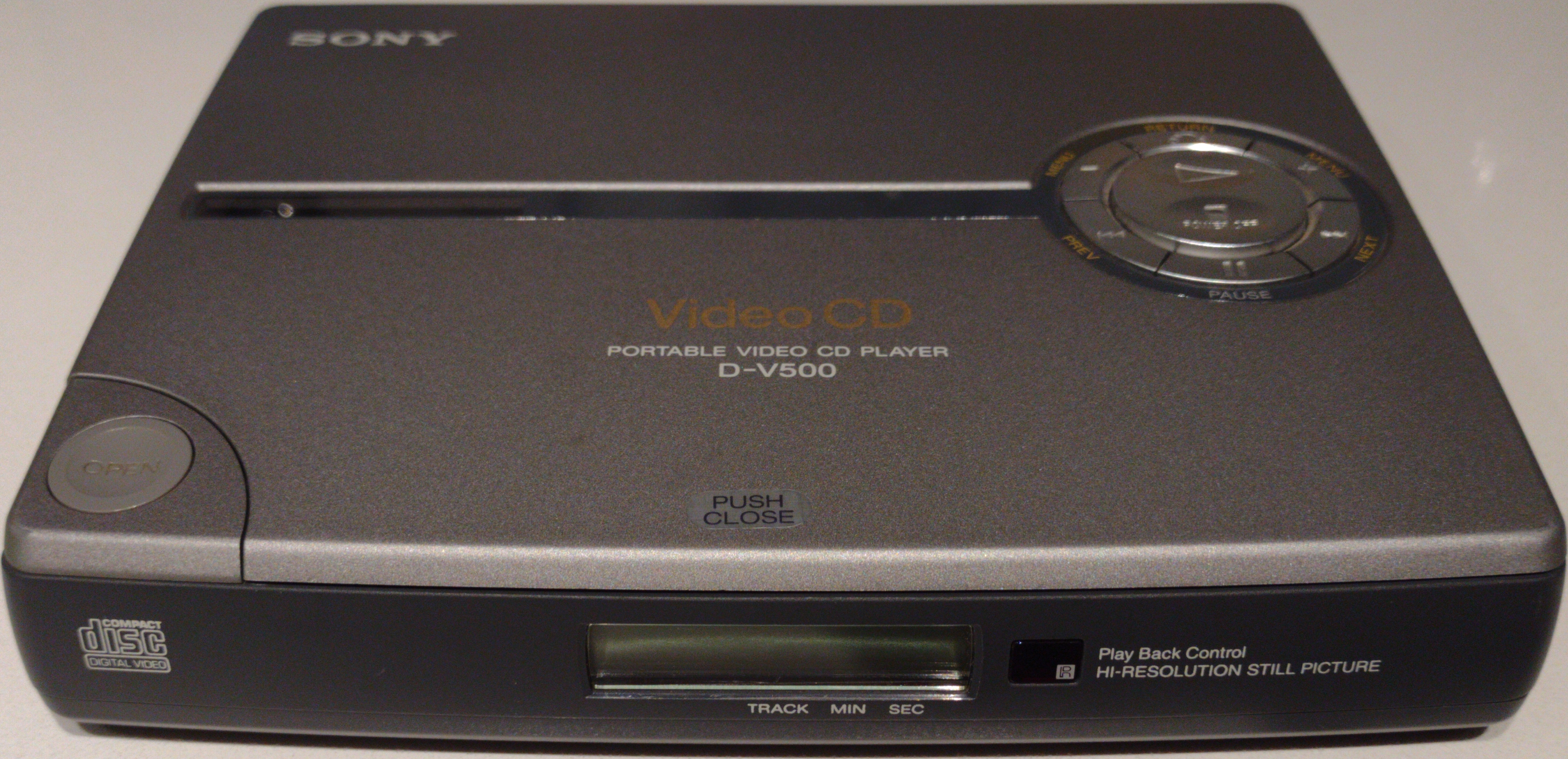
A Sony D-V500 portable video CD player from 1996. Note that it does not bear the Discman brand.

Video CD Discman, later rebranded as VCD Walkman, was a line of portable Video CD players. They were able to output the audio from video CDs as usual, but were also equipped with an additional 3.5mm audio/video-to-RCA connector output.

=== Others ===
- Intelligent Discman was a line of Discman players that played CD-i format discs.
- CD-ROM Discman, both Sony and Panasonic released portable CD players with a PCMCIA card connector for use as an external CD-ROM drive on a computer, though with a lower speed than dedicated computer drives.
- DVD Discman, later rebranded as DVD Walkman, was a line of portable DVD players.

== Gallery ==
=== Sony D-50/D-5 ===
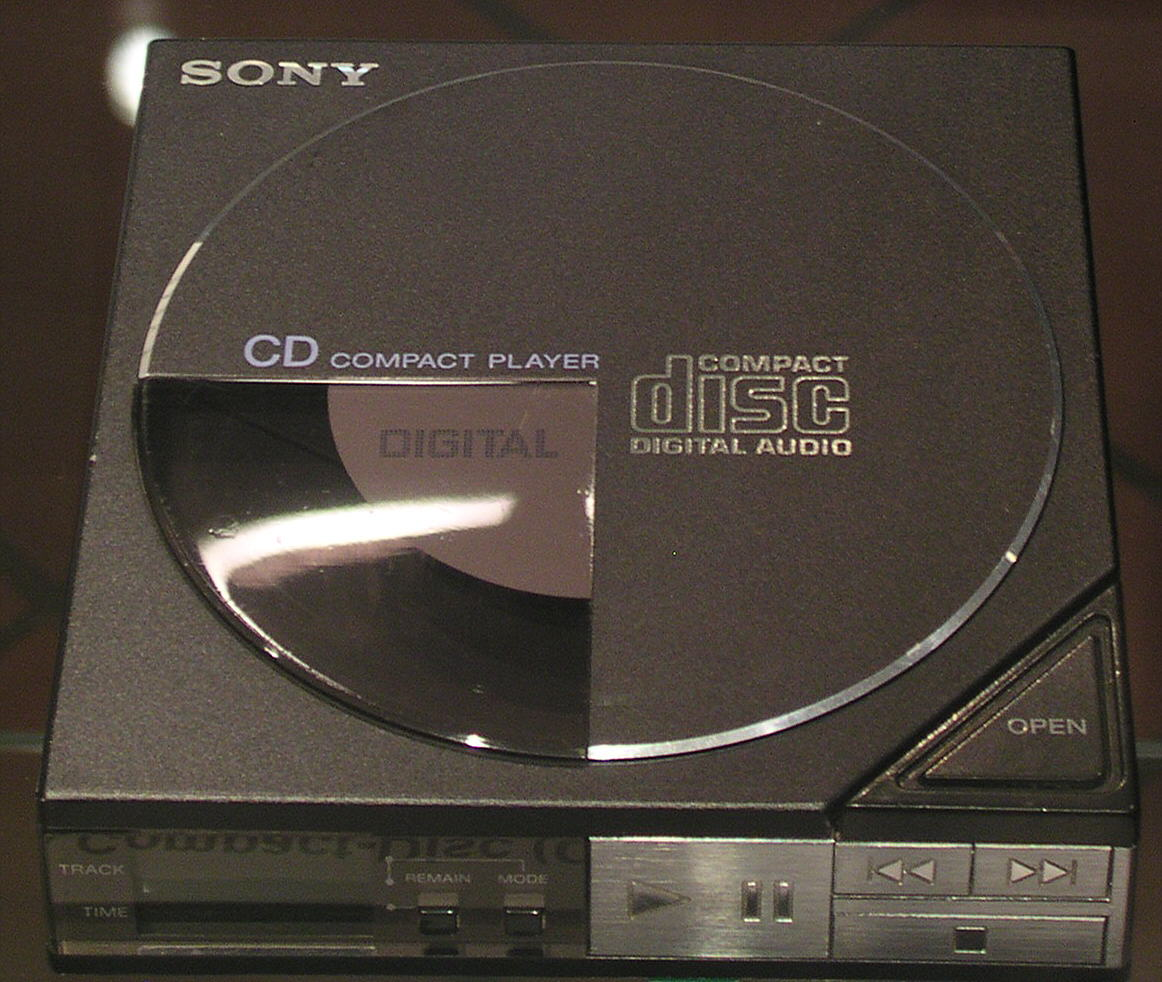
Sony D-50 without the Discman brand.

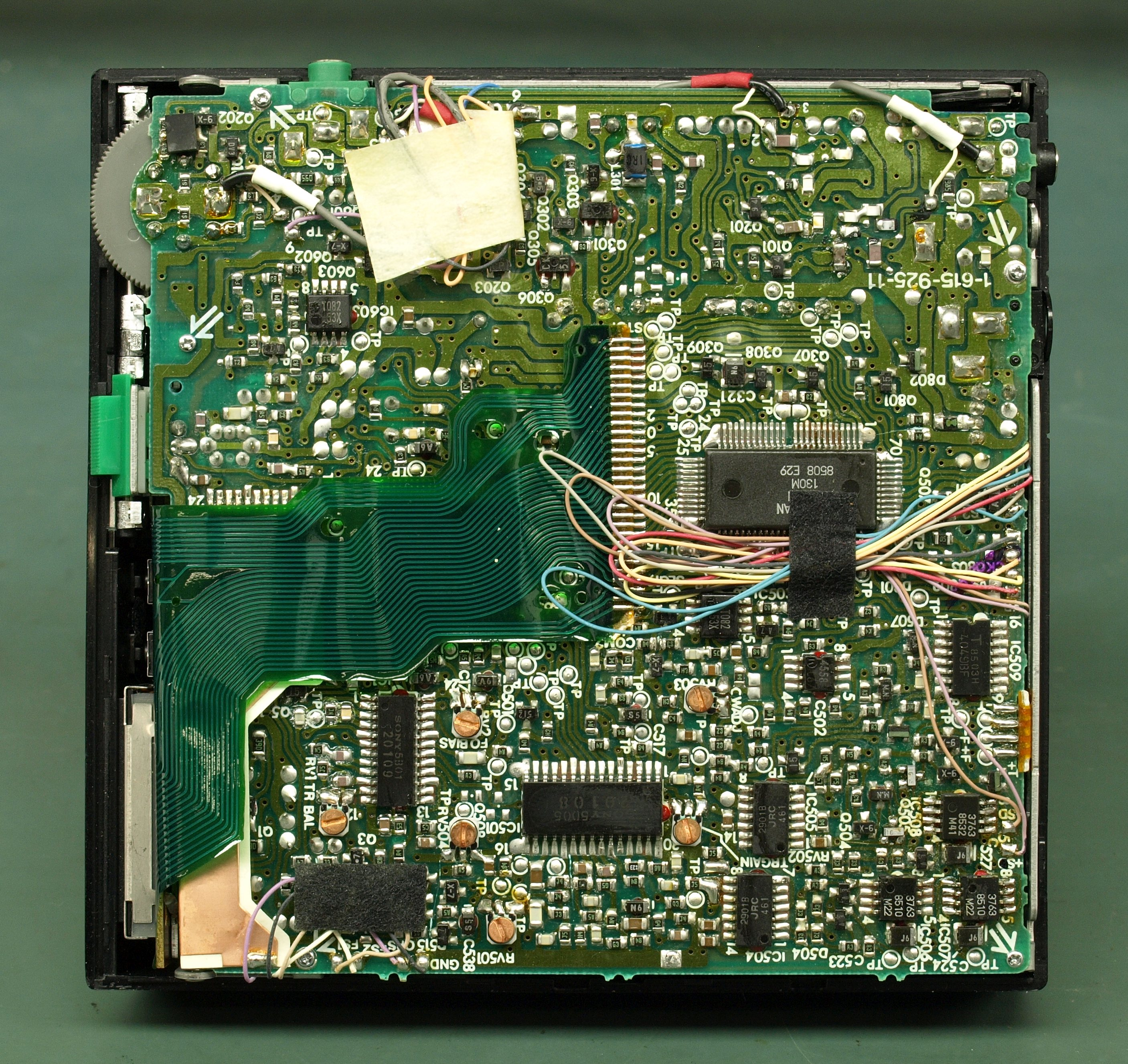
Sony D-50 with its rear cover removed, revealing the main PCB.

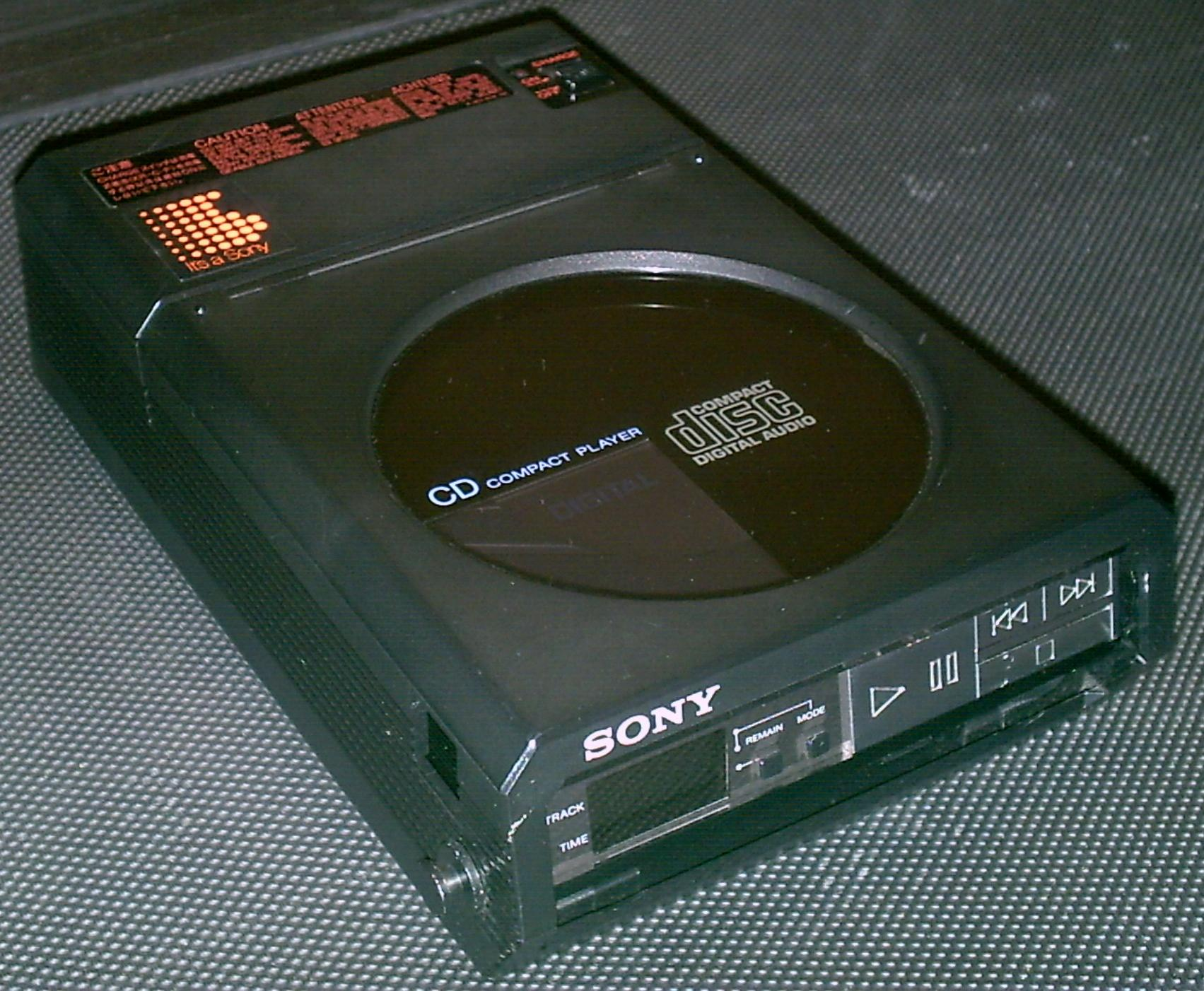
Sony D-50 with the optional rechargeable battery station.

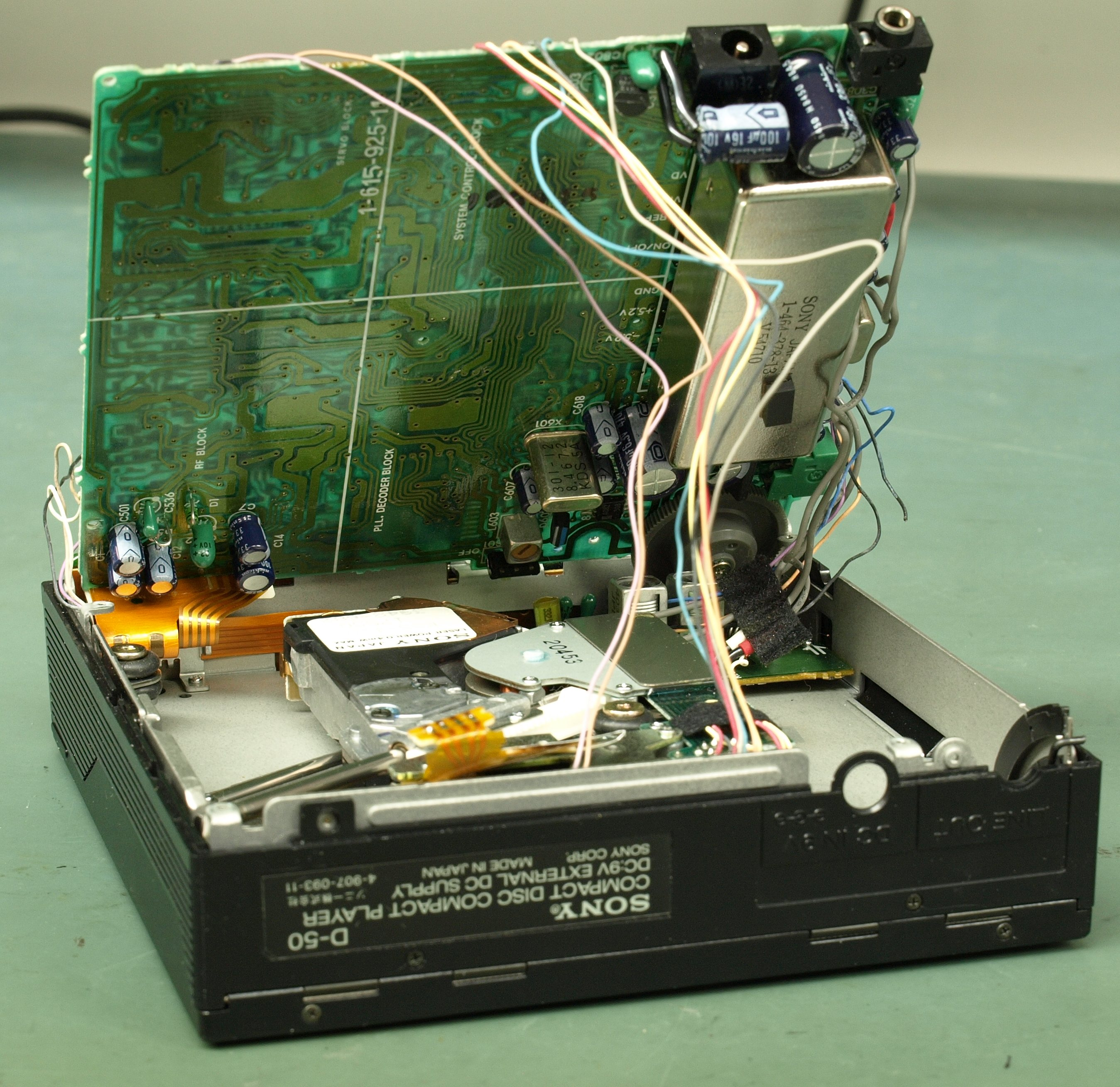
Sony D-50 with its main PCB flipped up.

== See also ==
- Sony Data Discman
- Sony Walkman
