= CD player =

Electronic device that plays audio compact discs

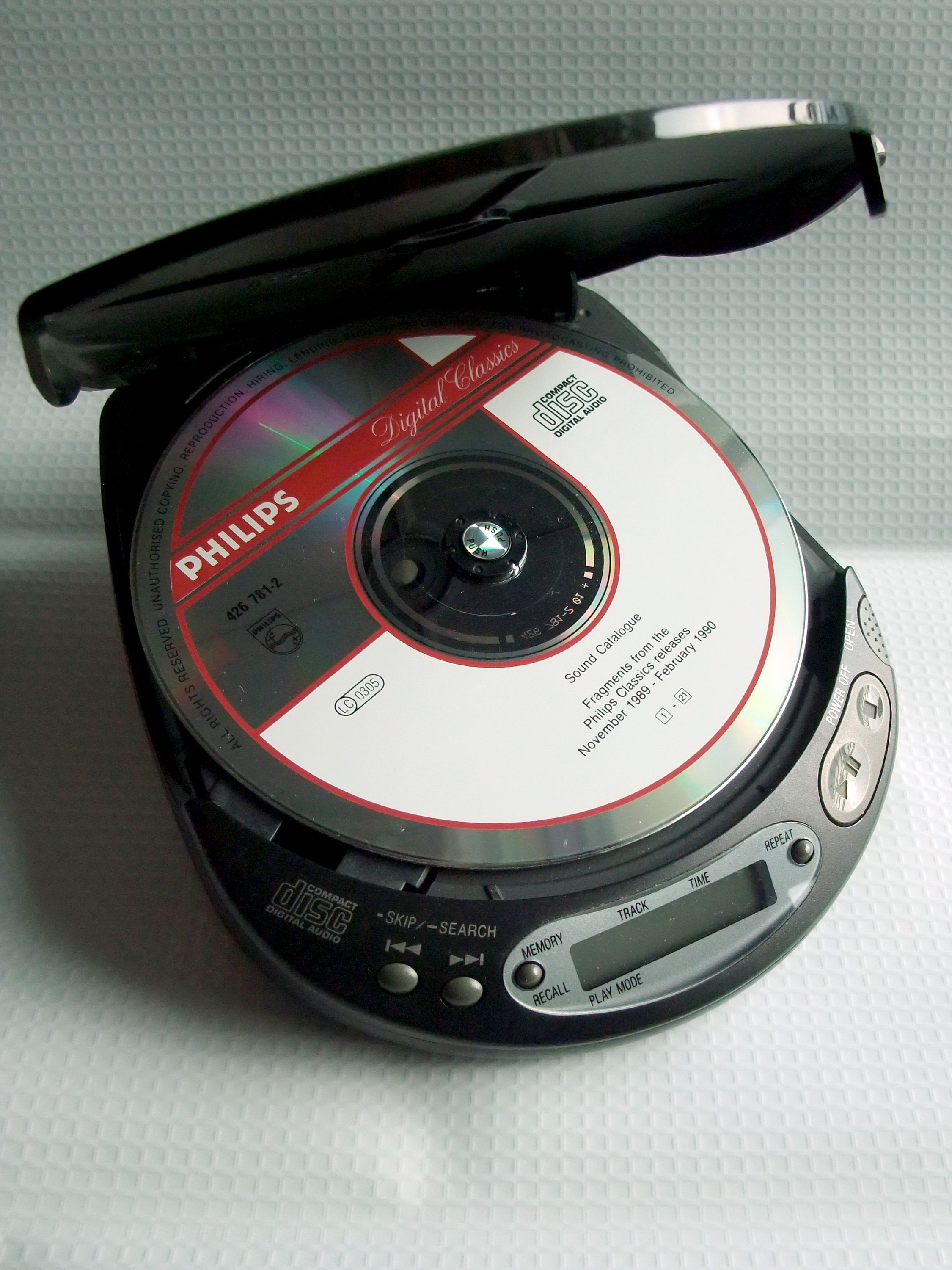
A portable CD player

A CD player is an electronic device that plays audio compact discs, which are a digital optical disc data storage format. CD players were first sold to consumers in 1982. CDs typically contain recordings of audio material such as music or audiobooks. CD players may be part of home stereo systems, car audio systems, personal computers, or portable CD players such as CD boomboxes. Most CD players produce an output signal via a headphone jack or RCA jacks. To use a CD player in a home stereo system, the user connects an RCA cable from the RCA jacks to a hi-fi (or other amplifier) and loudspeakers for listening to music. To listen to music using a CD player with a headphone output jack, the user plugs headphones or earphones into the headphone jack.

Modern units can play audio formats other than the original CD PCM audio coding, such as MP3, AAC and WMA. DJs playing dance music at clubs often use specialized players with an adjustable playback speed to alter the pitch and tempo of the music. Audio engineers using CD players to play music for an event through a sound reinforcement system use professional audio-grade CD players. CD playback functionality is also available on CD-ROM/DVD-ROM drive-equipped computers as well as on DVD players and most optical disc-based home video game consoles.

== History ==
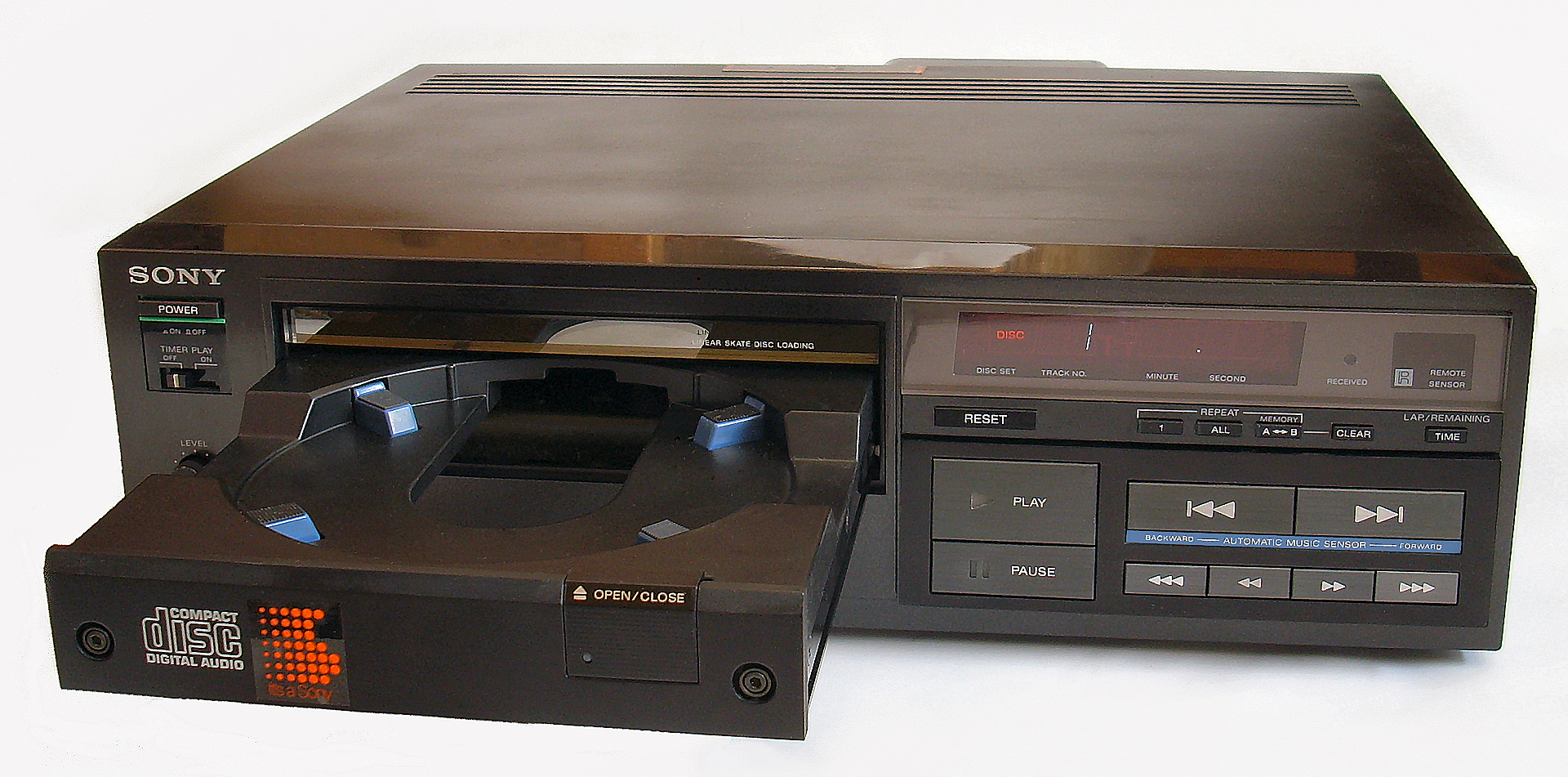
Sony CDP-101 from 1982, the first commercially released CD player for consumers

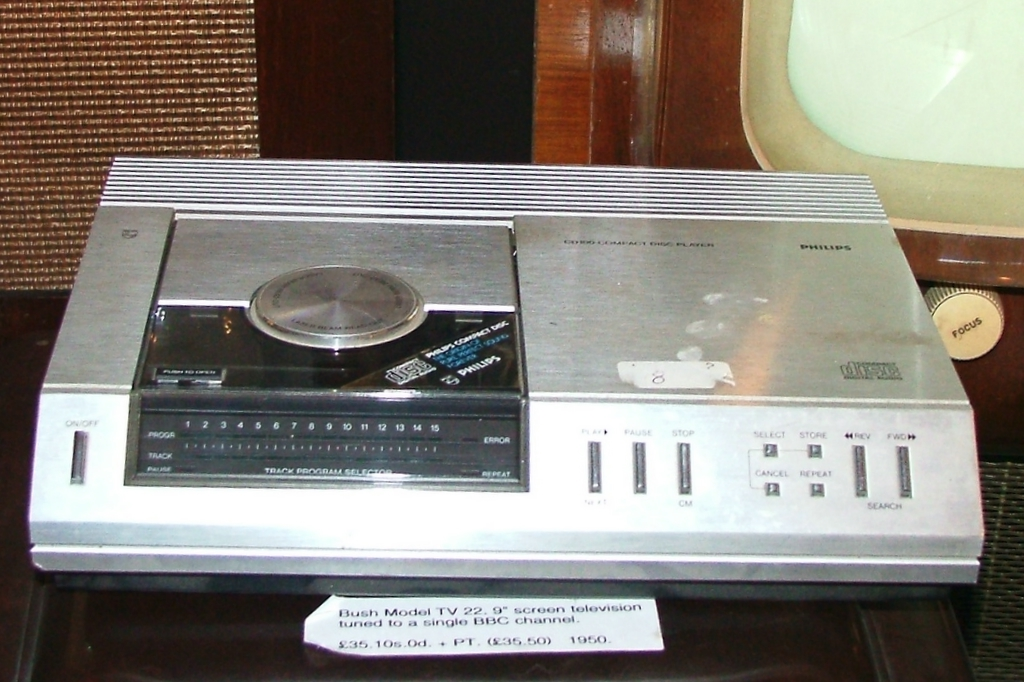
Philips CD100 from 1983, the first commercially released CD player in the USA and Europe

American inventor James T. Russell is known for inventing the first system to record digital video information on an optical transparent foil that is lit from behind by a high-power halogen lamp. Russell's patent application was first filed in 1966, and he was granted a patent in 1970. Following litigation, Sony and Philips licensed Russell's recording patents (then held by a Canadian company, Optical Recording Corp.) in the 1980s.

The compact disc is not based on Russell's invention; it is an evolution of LaserDisc technology, where a focused laser beam is used that enables the high information density required for high-quality digital audio signals. Prototypes were developed by Philips and Sony independently in the late 1970s. In 1979, Sony and Philips set up a joint task force of engineers to design a new digital audio disc. After a year of experimentation and discussion, the Red Book CD-DA standard was published in 1980. After their commercial release in 1982, compact discs and their players were extremely popular. Despite costing up to $1,000, over 400,000 CD players were sold in the United States between 1983 and 1984. The success of the compact disc has been credited to the cooperation between Philips and Sony, who came together to agree upon and develop compatible hardware. The unified design of the compact disc allowed consumers to purchase any disc or player from any company and allowed the CD to dominate the at-home music market unchallenged.

The Sony CDP-101, released in 1982, was the world's first commercially released compact disc player. It was originally sold only in Japan.

Unlike early LaserDisc players, the first CD players already used laser diodes instead of larger helium-neon lasers.

=== Digital audio laser-disc prototypes ===
In 1974, Lou Ottens, director of the audio division of Philips, started a small group with the aim to develop an analog optical audio disc with a diameter of 20 cm (7.9 in) and a sound quality superior to that of the vinyl record. However, due to the unsatisfactory performance of the analog format, two Philips research engineers recommended a digital format in March 1974. In 1977, Philips then established a laboratory with the mission of creating a digital audio disc. The diameter of Philips's prototype compact disc was set at 11.5 cm (4.5 in), the diagonal of an audio cassette.

Heitaro Nakajima, who developed an early digital audio recorder within Japan's national public broadcasting organization NHK in 1970, became general manager of Sony's audio department in 1971. His team developed a digital PCM adaptor audio tape recorder using a Betamax video recorder in 1973. After this, in 1974, the leap to storing digital audio on an optical disc was easily made. Sony first publicly demonstrated an optical digital audio disc in September 1976. A year later, in September 1977, Sony showed the press a 30 cm (12 in) disc that could play 60 minutes of digital audio (44,100 Hz sampling rate and 16-bit resolution) using MFM modulation. In September 1978, the company demonstrated an optical digital audio disc with a 150-minute playing time, 44,056 Hz sampling rate, 16-bit linear resolution, and cross-interleaved error correction code—specifications similar to those later settled upon for the standard compact disc format in 1980. Technical details of Sony's digital audio disc were presented during the 62nd AES Convention, held on 13–16 March 1979, in Brussels. Sony's AES technical paper was published on 1 March 1979. A week later, on 8 March, Philips publicly demonstrated a prototype of an optical digital audio disc at a press conference called "Philips Introduce Compact Disc" in Eindhoven, Netherlands.

=== Collaboration and standardization ===
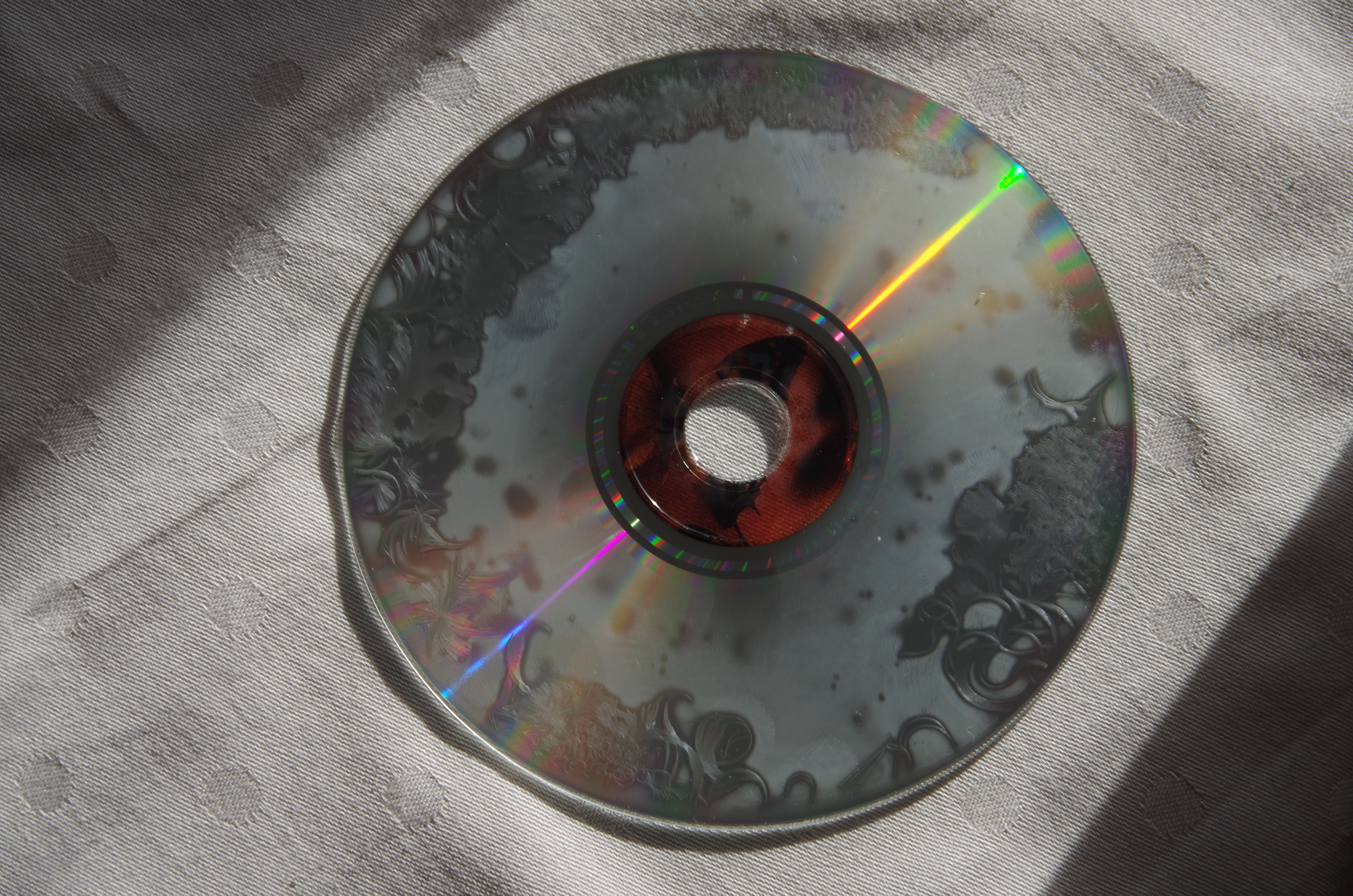
This disc is highly corroded. The error correction cannot correct all errors. Two minutes can be played, however.

Sony executive Norio Ohga, later CEO and chairman of Sony, and Heitaro Nakajima were convinced of the format's commercial potential and pushed further development despite widespread skepticism. As a result, in 1979, Sony and Philips set up a joint task force of engineers to design a new digital audio disc. Led by engineers Kees Schouhamer Immink and Toshitada Doi, the research pushed forward laser and optical disc technology. After a year of experimentation and discussion, the task force produced the Red Book CD-DA standard. First published in 1980, the standard was formally adopted by the IEC as an international standard in 1987, with various amendments becoming part of the standard in 1996.

Philips coined the term compact disc in line with another audio product, the Compact Cassette, and contributed the general manufacturing process, based on video LaserDisc technology. Philips also contributed eight-to-fourteen modulation (EFM), which offers a certain resilience to defects such as scratches and fingerprints, while Sony contributed the error-correction method, cross-interleaved Reed–Solomon coding (CIRC). The Compact Disc Story, told by a former member of the task force, gives background information on the many technical decisions made, including the choice of the sampling frequency, playing time, and disc diameter. The task force consisted of around four to eight persons, though according to Philips, the compact disc was "invented collectively by a large group of people working as a team."

=== First Red Book CDs and players ===
Red Book was the first standard in the Rainbow Books series of standards.

Philips established the Polydor Pressing Operations plant in Langenhagen near Hannover, Germany, and quickly passed a series of milestones.

- The first test pressing was of a recording of Richard Strauss's Eine Alpensinfonie (An Alpine Symphony) played by the Berlin Philharmonic and conducted by Herbert von Karajan, who had been enlisted as an ambassador for the format in 1979.
- The first public demonstration was on the BBC television program Tomorrow's World in 1981, when the Bee Gees' album Living Eyes (1981) was played.
- The first commercial compact disc was produced on 17 August 1982. It was a recording from 1979 of Claudio Arrau performing Chopin waltzes (Philips 400 025-2). Arrau was invited to the Langenhagen plant to press the start button.
- The first popular music CD produced at the new factory was The Visitors (1981) by ABBA.
- The first 50 titles were released in Japan on 1 October 1982, with the first-cataloged CD in this wave being a reissue of Billy Joel's 52nd Street.

The Japanese launch was followed in March 1983 by the introduction of CD players and discs to Europe and North America (where CBS Records released 16 titles). This event is often seen as the "Big Bang" of the digital audio revolution. The new audio disc was enthusiastically received, especially in the early-adopting classical music and audiophile communities, and its handling quality received particular praise. As the price of players gradually came down, and with the introduction of the portable Walkman, the CD began to gain popularity in the larger popular and rock music markets. The first artist to sell a million copies on CD was Dire Straits, with their 1985 album Brothers in Arms. The first major artist to have his entire catalog converted to CD was David Bowie, whose 15 studio albums were made available by RCA Records in February 1985, along with four greatest hits albums. In 1988, 400 million CDs were manufactured by 50 pressing plants around the world.

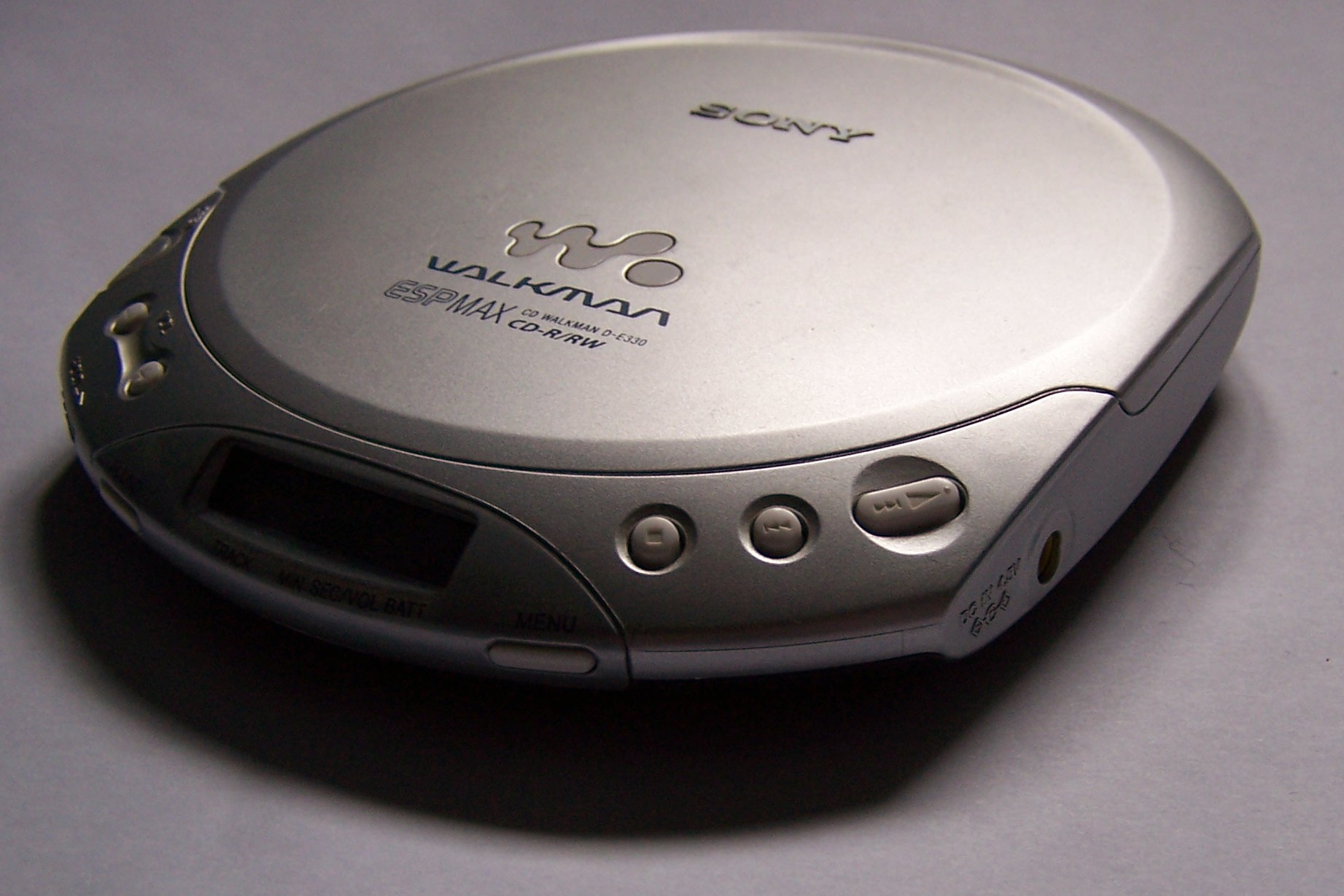
Sony CD Walkman D-E330

=== Further development and decline ===
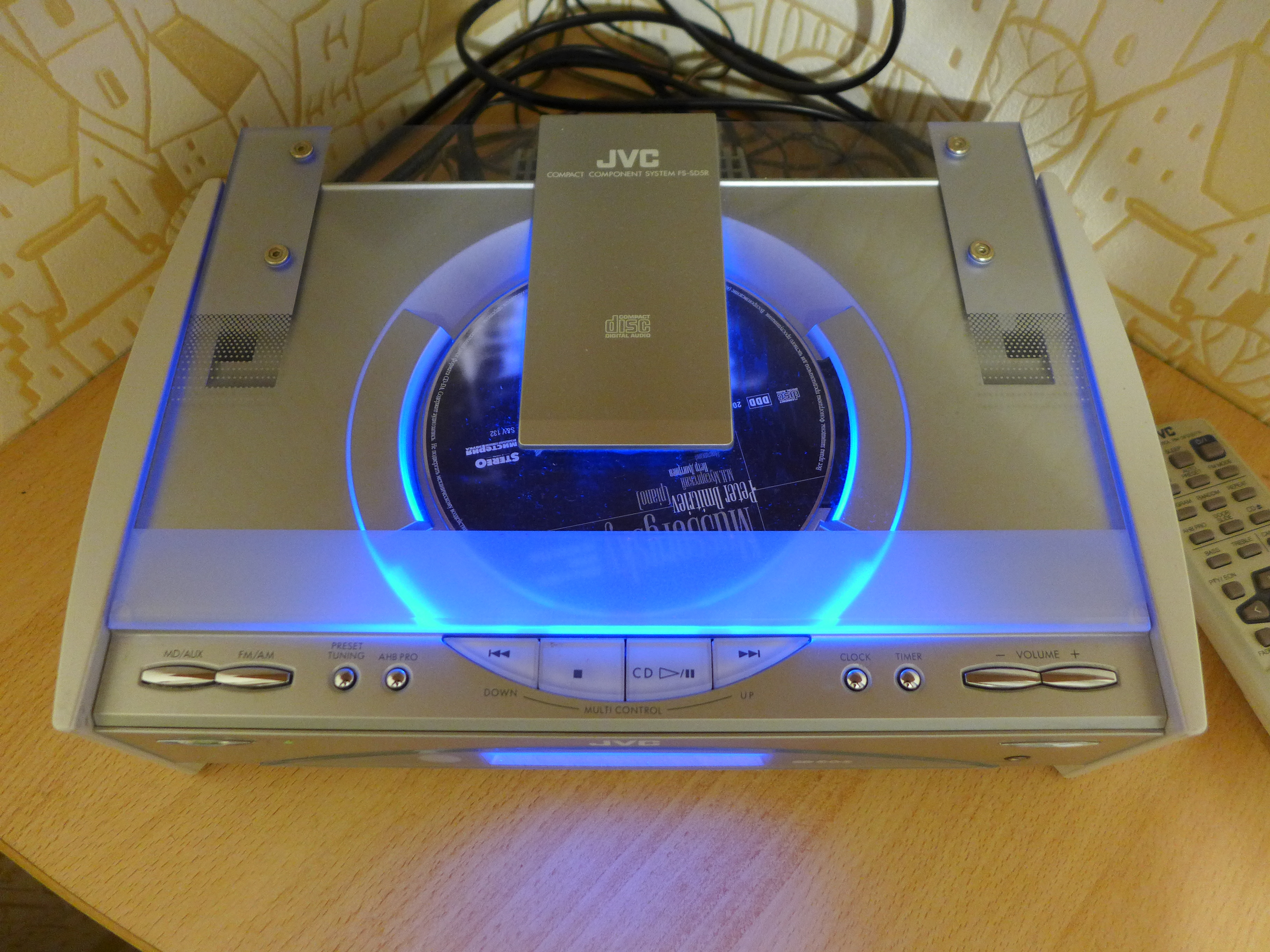
A JVC FS-SD5R CD player from the 1990s with a transparent plastic cover and blue backlight

The CD was planned to be the successor of the gramophone record for playing music, rather than primarily as a data storage medium, but from its origins as a format for music, its use has grown to encompass other applications. In 1983, following the CD's introduction, Immink and Braat presented the first experiments with erasable compact discs during the 73rd AES Convention. In June 1985, the computer-readable CD-ROM (read-only memory) was introduced and, in 1990, the CD-Recordable, also developed by both Sony and Philips. Recordable CDs were a new alternative to tape for recording music and copying music albums without the defects introduced in the compression used in other digital recording methods. Other newer video formats such as DVD and Blu-ray use the same physical geometry as CD, and most DVD and Blu-ray players are backward compatible with audio CD.

By the early 2000s, the CD player had largely replaced the audio cassette player as standard equipment in new automobiles, with 2010 being the final model year for any car in the US to have a factory-equipped cassette player. Currently, with the increasing popularity of portable digital audio players, such as mobile phones, and solid state music storage, CD players are being phased out of automobiles in favor of minijack auxiliary inputs and connections to USB devices.

Some CD players incorporate disc changers. Commonly, these can hold 3, 5, 6, or 10 discs at once and change from one disc to the next without user intervention. Disc changers capable of holding up to 400 discs at once were available. Also, the user can manually choose the disc to be played, making it similar to a jukebox. They were often built into car audio and home stereo systems, although 7 disc CD changers were once made by NEC and Nakamichi for PCs. Some could also play DVD and Blu-ray discs.

Meanwhile, with the advent and popularity of Internet-based distribution of files in lossy-compressed audio formats such as MP3, sales of CDs began to decline in the 2000s. For example, between 2000 and 2008, despite overall growth in music sales and one anomalous year of increase, major-label CD sales declined overall by 20% – although independent and DIY music sales may be tracking better (according to figures released 30 March 2009), and CDs still continue to sell greatly. As of 2012, CDs and DVDs made up only 34% of music sales in the United States. In Japan, however, over 80% of music was bought on CDs and other physical formats as of 2015.

== Inner workings ==
The process of playing an audio CD, touted as a digital audio storage medium, starts with the plastic polycarbonate compact disc, a medium that contains the digitally encoded data. The disc is placed in a tray that either opens up (as with portable CD players) or slides out (the norm with in-home CD players, computer disc drives and game consoles). In some systems, the user slides the disc into a slot (e.g., car stereo CD players). Once the disc is loaded into the tray, the data is read out by a mechanism that scans the circular data tracks using a laser beam. An electric motor spins the disc. The tracking control is done by analog servo amplifiers and then the high-frequency analog signal read from the disc is digitized, processed and decoded into analog audio and digital control data which is used by the player to position the playback mechanism on the correct track, do the skip and seek functions and display track, time, index and, on newer players in the 2010s, display title and artist information on a display placed in the front panel.

=== Analog signal recovery from the disc ===
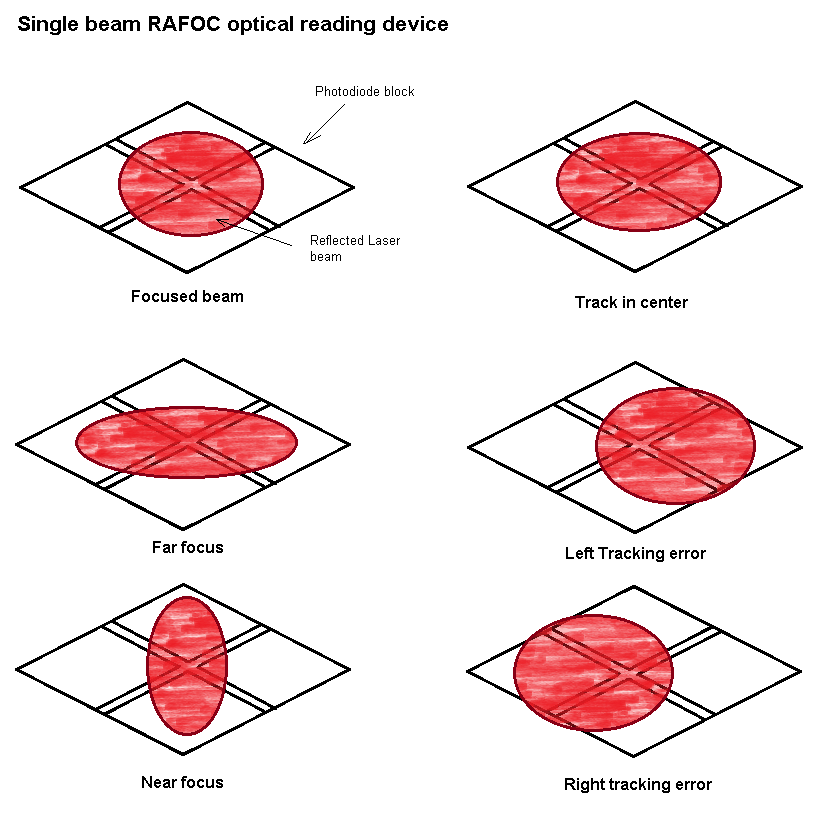
Photodiode array on the Philips RAFOC single-beam tracking optical device used in many CDM optical assemblies

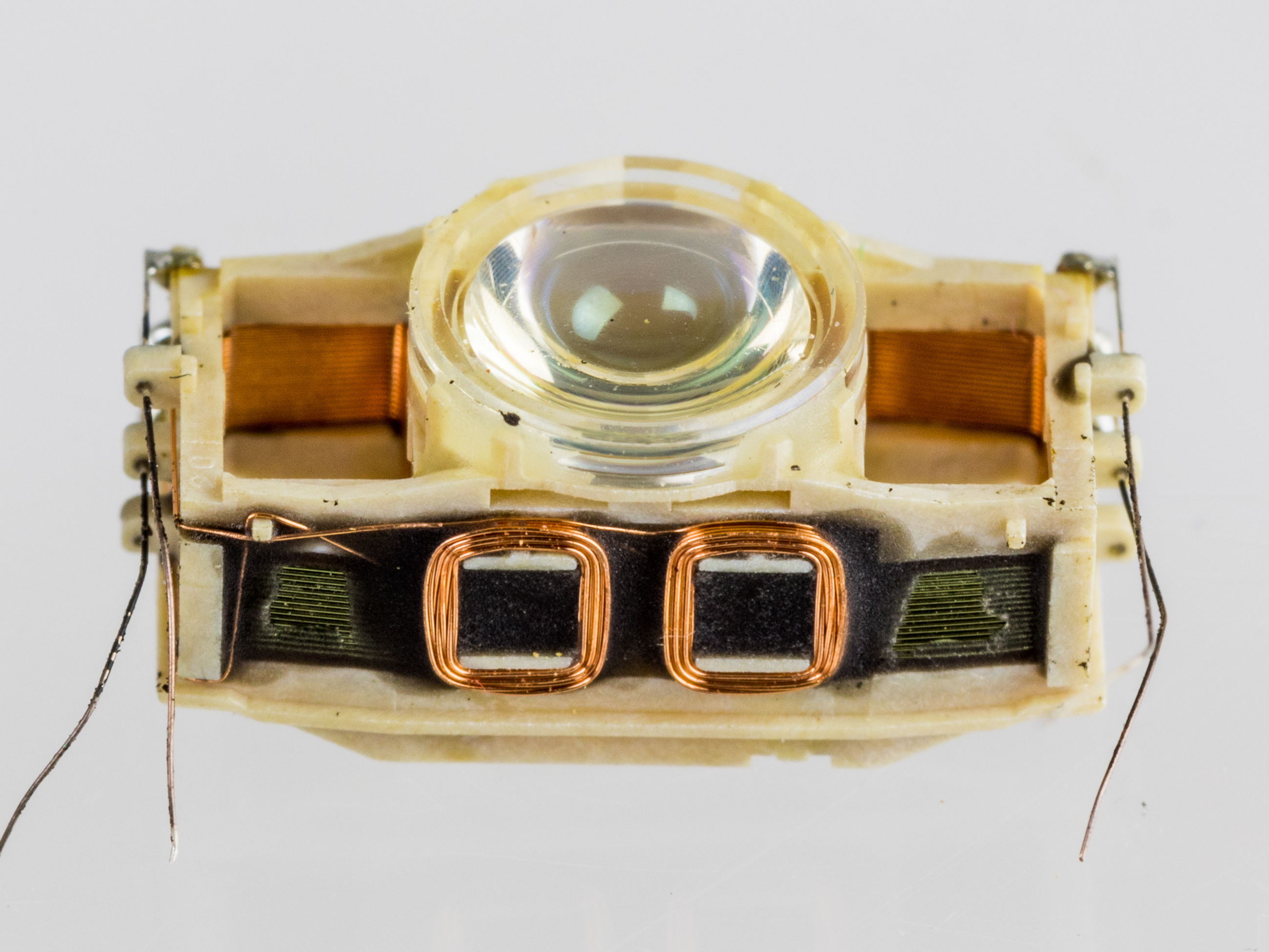
Movable lens with coils

To read the data from the disc, a laser beam shines on the surface of the disc. Surface differences between discs being played, and tiny position differences once loaded, are handled by using a movable lens with a very close focal length to focus the light on the disc. A low-mass lens coupled to an electromagnetic coil is in charge of keeping the beam focused on the 600 nm wide data track.

When the player tries to read from a stop, it first does a focus seek program that moves the lens up and down from the surface of the disc until a reflection is detected; when there is a reflection, the servo electronics lock in place, keeping the lens in perfect focus while the disc rotates and changes its relative height from the optical block.

Different brands and models of optical assemblies use different methods of focus detection. On most players, the focus position detection is made using the difference in the current output of a block of four photodiodes. The photodiode block and the optics are arranged in such a way that a perfect focus projects a circular pattern on the block, while a far or near focus projects an ellipse differing in the position of the long edge in north–south or west-southwest. That difference is the information that the servo amplifier uses to keep the lens at the proper reading distance during the playback operation, even if the disc is warped.

Another servo mechanism in the player is in charge of keeping the focused beam centered on the data track.

Two optical pick-up designs exist. The original CDM series from Philips uses a magnetic actuator mounted on a swing-arm to do coarse and fine tracking. Using only one laser beam and the 4 photodiode block, the servo knows if the track is centered by measuring side-by-side movement of the beam hitting the block and corrects to keep the light on the center.

The other design by Sony uses a diffraction grating to part the laser light into one main beam and two sub-beams. When focused, the two peripheral beams cover the border of the adjacent tracks a few micrometers apart from the main beam and reflect back on two photodiodes separated from the main block of four. The servo detects the RF signal being received on the peripheral receivers and the difference in output between these two diodes conform the tracking error signal that the system uses to keep the optics in the proper track. The tracking signal is fed to two systems, one integrated in the focus lens assembly can do fine tracking correction and the other system can move the entire optical assembly side by side to do coarse track jumps.

The sum of the output from the four photodiodes makes the RF or high-frequency signal, which is an electronic mirror of the pits and lands recorded on the disc. The RF signal, when observed on an oscilloscope, has a characteristic eye pattern and its usefulness in servicing the machine is paramount for detecting and diagnosing problems, and calibrating CD players for operation.

=== Digital signal processing ===
The first stage in the processing chain for the analog RF signal (from the photoreceptor device) is digitizing it. Using various circuits like a simple comparator or a data slicer, the analog signal becomes a chain of two binary digital values, 1 and 0. This signal carries all the information in a CD and is modulated using a system called eight-to-fourteen modulation (EFM). The second stage is demodulating the EFM signal into a data frame that contains the audio samples, error correction parity bits, according with the CIRC error correction code, and control data for the player display and micro-computer. The EFM demodulator also decodes part of the CD signal and routes it to the proper circuits, separating audio, parity and control (subcode) data.

After demodulating, a CIRC error corrector takes each audio data frame, stores it in memory and verifies that it has been read correctly. If it is not, it takes the parity and correction bits and fixes the data, then it moves it out to a digital-to-analog converter (DAC) to be converted to an analog audio signal. If the missing data is enough to make recovery impossible, the correction is made by interpolating the data from subsequent frames so the missing part is not noticed. Each player has a different interpolation ability. If too many data frames are missing or unrecoverable, the audio signal may be impossible to fix by interpolation, so an audio mute flag is raised to mute the DAC to avoid playback of invalid data. The Redbook standard dictates that, if there is invalid, erroneous or missing audio data, it cannot be output to the speakers as digital noise; it has to be muted.

=== Player control ===
The Audio CD format requires every player to have enough processing power to decode the CD data; this is normally made by application-specific integrated circuits (ASICs). ASICs do not work by themselves; they require a main microcomputer or microcontroller to orchestrate the entire machine. The firmware of basic CD players typically is a real-time operating system.

Some early optical computer drives are equipped with an audio connector and buttons for standalone CD playback functionality.

== Tray design types ==
=== Tray loading ===
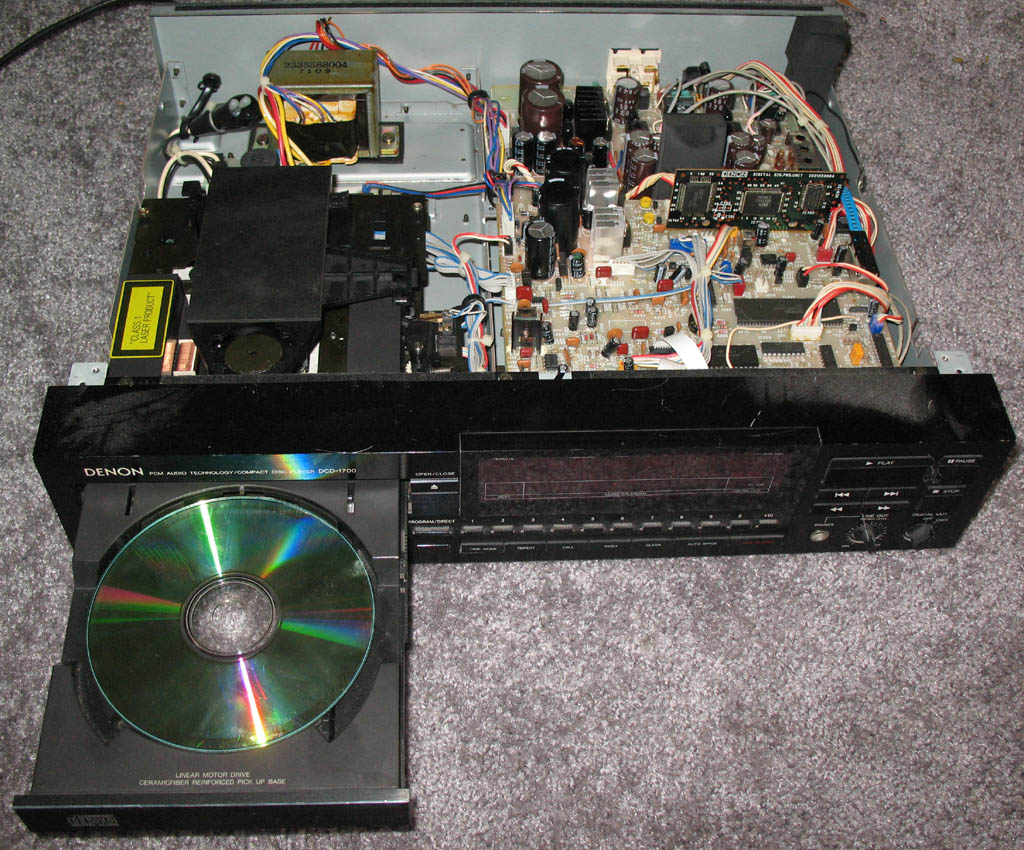
A 1980s-era Denon CD player with the chassis cover removed to show the electronic and mechanical components.

An example of a Pioneer CD player's tray closing.

Sony released its CDP-101 CD player in 1982 with a slide-out tray design for the CD. As it was easy to manufacture and to use, most CD player manufacturers stayed with the tray style ever since. The tray mechanism is also used in many modern desktop computer cases, as well as the Philips CD-i, PlayStation 2, Xbox and Xbox 360. However, there have been some notable exceptions to this common CD tray design.

=== Vertical loading ===
During the launch of the first prototype Goronta CD player by Sony at the Japanese Audio Fair in 1982, Sony showcased the vertical loading design. Although the Sony prototype design was never put into volume production, the concept was for a time adopted for production by a number of early Japanese CD player manufacturers, including Alpine/Luxman, Matsushita under the Technics brand, Kenwood and Toshiba/Aurex. For the early vertical loading players, Alpine sourced their AD-7100 player designs for Luxman, Kenwood and Toshiba (using their Aurex brand). Kenwood added their Sigma Drive outputs to this design as a modification. A picture of this early design can be seen on the Panasonic website. The vertical loading is similar the one common in cassette decks, where the holder opens, and disc is dropped to it. The holder is closed manually, by motor after pressing a button, or completely automatically. Some CD players combine vertical loading with slot loading due to the disc being drawn further into the disc holder as it closes.

=== Top loading ===
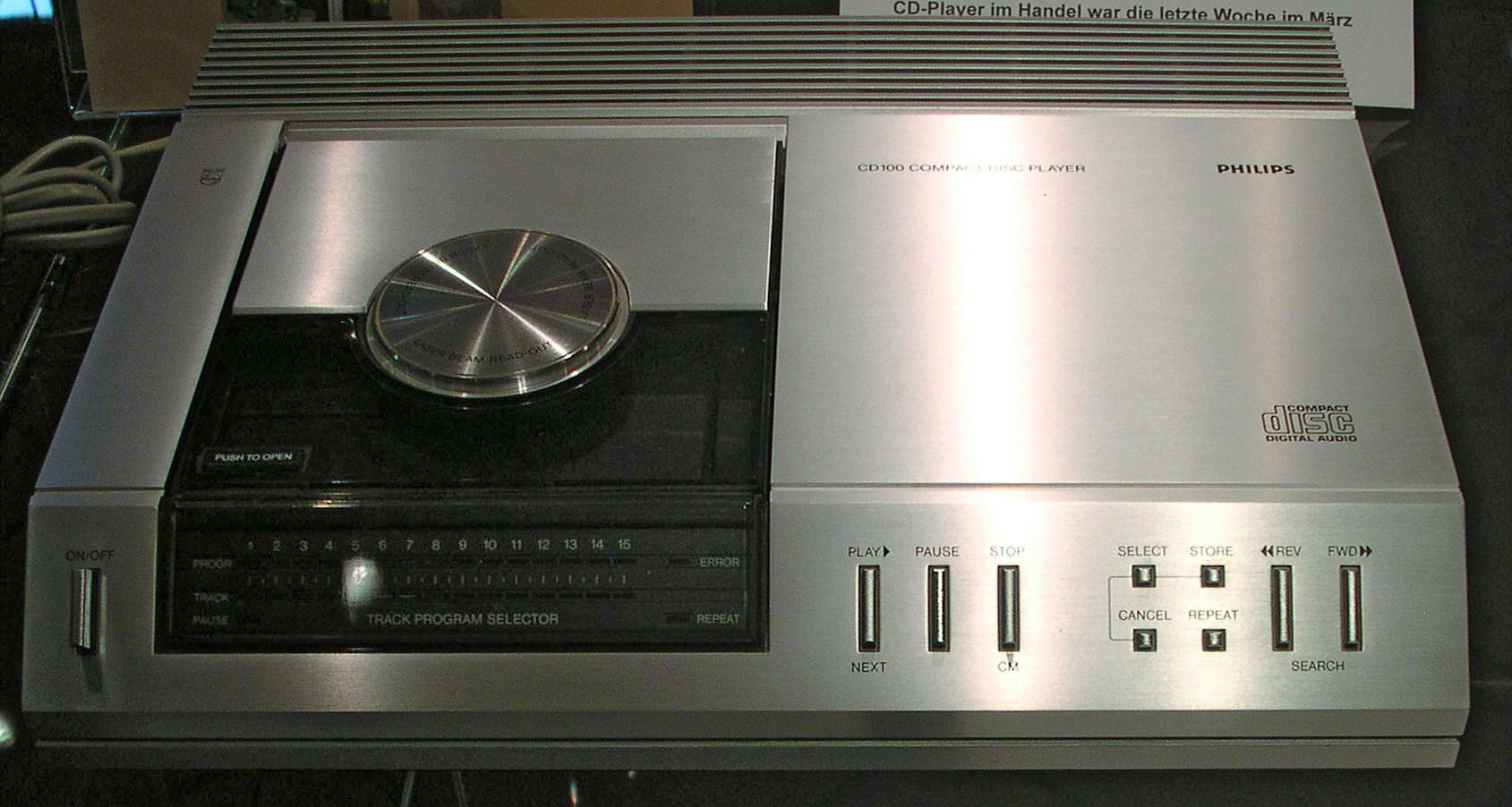
Philips CD100 Player

In 1983, Philips, at the US and European launch of the CD format, showcased the first top-loading CD tray designs with their CD100 CD player. (Philips audio products were sold as Magnavox in the US at the time.) The design had a clamp on the lid, which meant the user had to close it over the CD when it was placed inside the machine. Later, Meridian introduced their MCD high end CD player, with Meridian electronics in the Philips CD100 chassis.

Top-loading was adopted on various equipment designs, such as mini systems and portable CD players, but among stereo component CD players, only a handful of top-loading models have been made. Examples include Luxman's D-500 and D-500X series players and Denon's DP-S1, both launched in 1993. Top-loading is also common in players intended for broadcast and live sound DJ use, such as Technics' SL-P50 (1984–1985) and Technics SL-P1200 (1986–1992). They more closely mimic the physical arrangement and ergonomics of record turntables used in those applications.

The top-loading disc tray design is also used in most fifth-generation video game consoles (PlayStation, Saturn, 3DO Interactive Multiplayer), as well as the Dreamcast, GameCube, and Wii Mini.

=== Tray loading with sliding mechanism ===
The Philips CD303 of 1983-1984 was the first player to adopt tray loading with a sliding play mechanism. Basically, as the tray came out to collect the CD, the entire player's transport system also came out as one unit. The Meridians 200 and 203 players were of this type. They were also the first to use a design in which the audio electronics were in a separate enclosure from the CD drive and pickup mechanism. A similar mechanism is used in slim optical disc drives (also known as slim internal DVD drives, optical drives, or DVD burners), which were once commonly used in laptop computers.

=== Slot loading ===
Slot loading is the preferred loading mechanism for car audio players. There is no tray that pops out, and a motor is used to assist disc insertion and removal. Some slot-loading mechanisms and changers can load and play back Mini CDs without the need of an adapter (such as the original Wii model's standard-sized disc slot being capable of accepting smaller GameCube Game Discs) but they may work with limited functionality (a disc changer with a Mini CD inserted will refuse to operate until such disc is removed, for example). Non-circular CDs cannot be used on such loaders because they cannot handle non-circular discs. When inserted, such discs may become stuck and damage the mechanism. It is also used on some laptop computers, the original and slim PlayStation 3, the Wii's original model and its Family Edition and most eighth-generation video game consoles (the Wii U, PlayStation 4 and Xbox One), as well as the ninth-generation PlayStation 5 and Xbox Series X.

== Pickup mechanisms ==
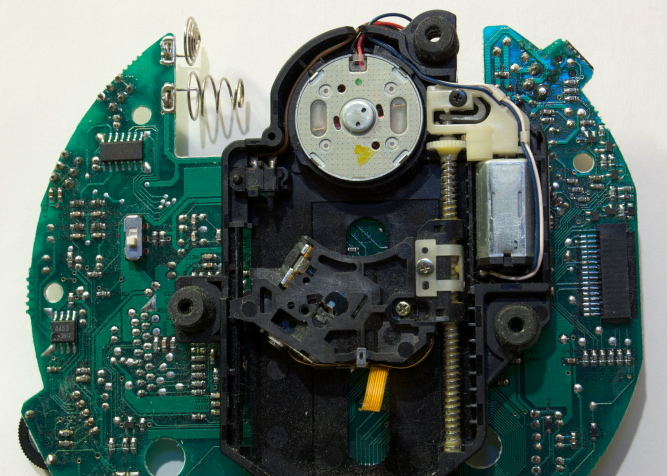
Underside view showing a radial-type tracking mechanism with screw drive

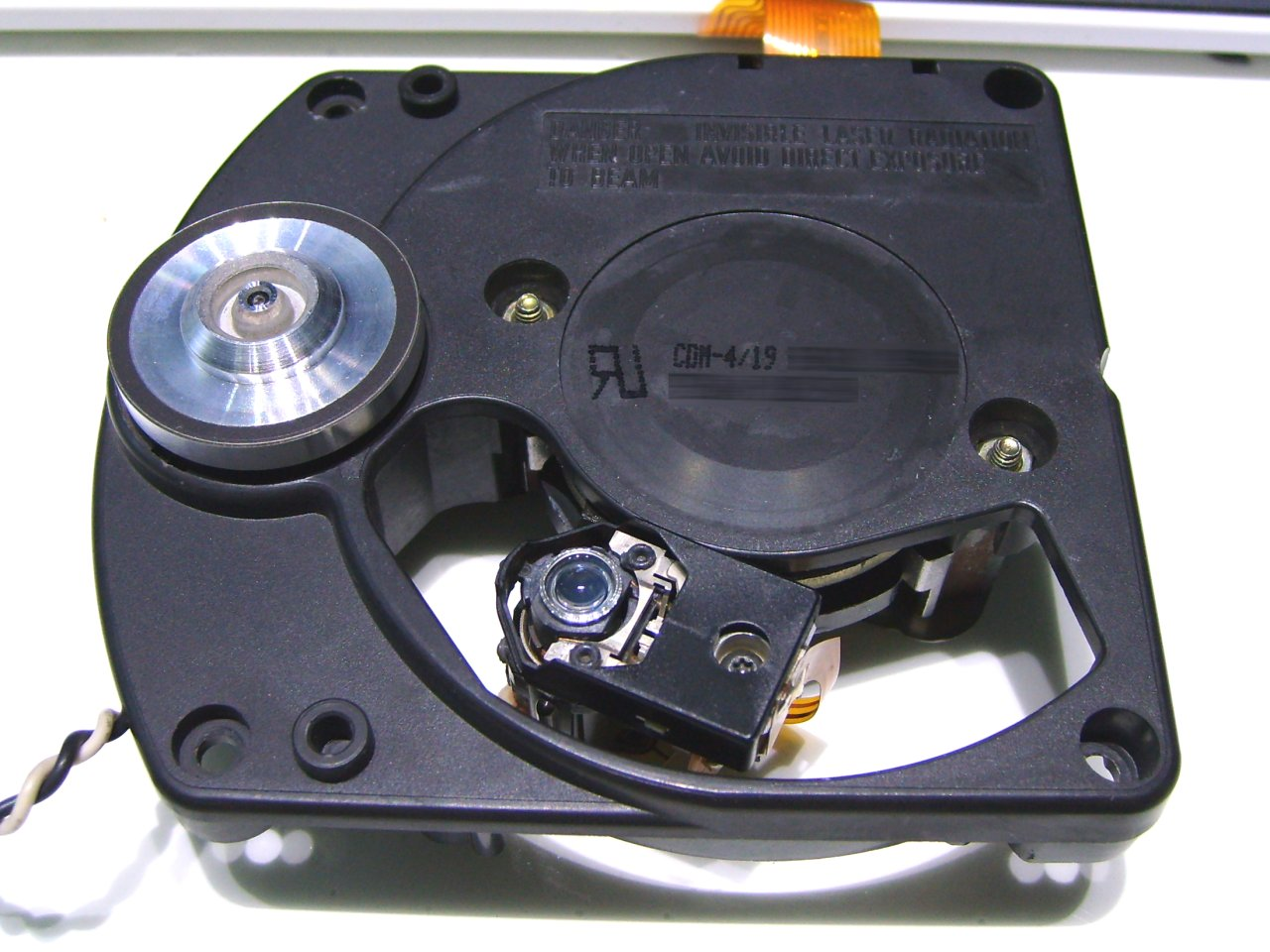
Philips swing arm optical mechanism

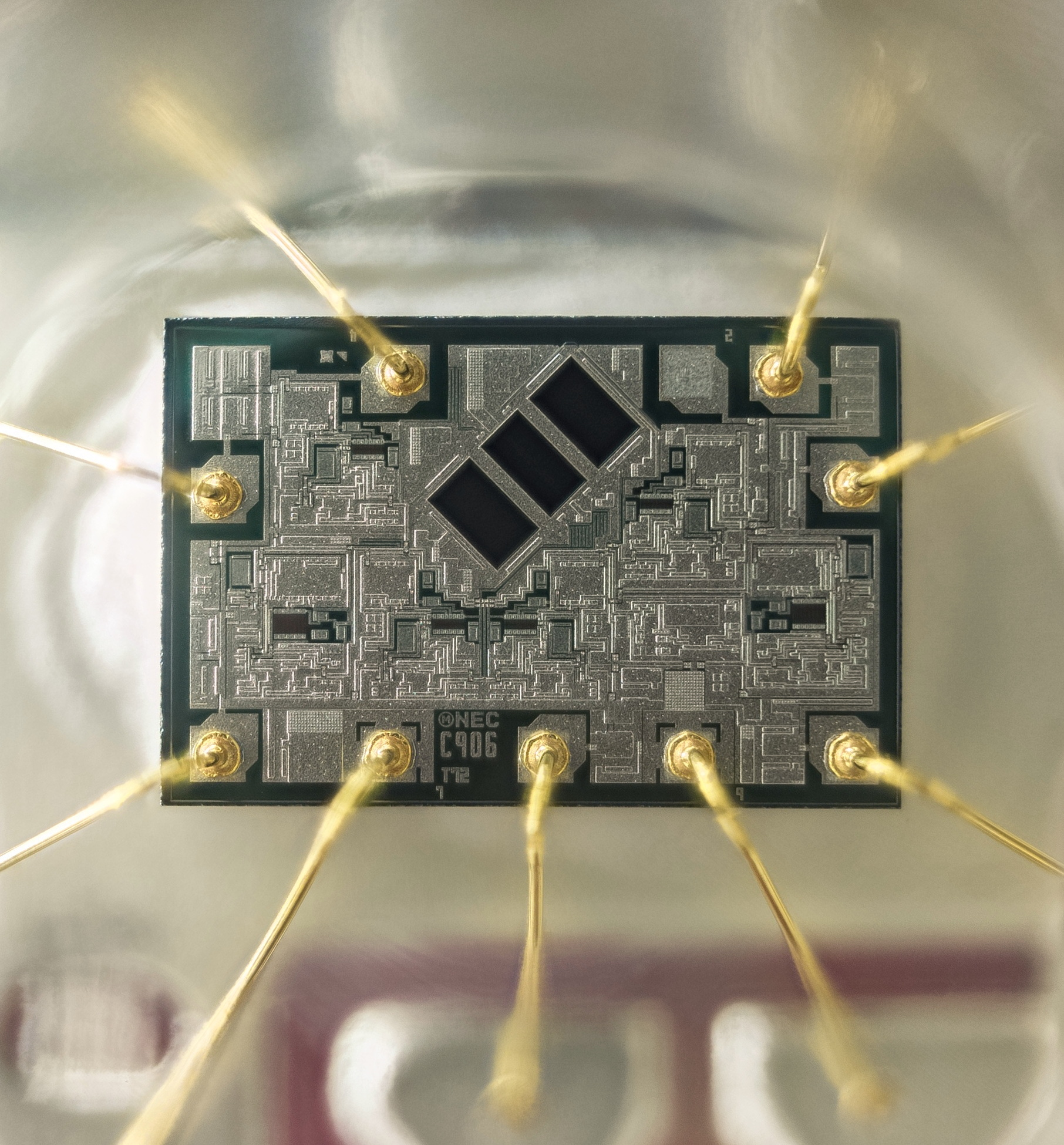
The optical chip extracted from a CD player. The three dark rectangles are photosensitive, read the data from the disk and keep the beam focused. Electronic tracking, aided by the two photodiodes at the sides, keeps the laser beam centered on the middle of the data track.

Two types of optical tracking mechanisms exist:

- The swing-arm mechanism, originally designed by Philips – the lens moves at the end of an arm, in a manner similar to the tone arm assembly of a record player. Used in the earliest Philips CD players and later replaced with cheaper radial mechanisms.
- The radial mechanism, designed by Sony, which is the one used in most CD players in the 2000s – the lens moves on a radial rail being driven by a rotating gear from a motor or a linear magnetic assembly. The motor or linear magnetic assembly consists of a solenoid mounted to the moving laser assembly, wound over a permanent magnetic field attached to the base of the mechanism. It is also known as three-beam linear tracking.

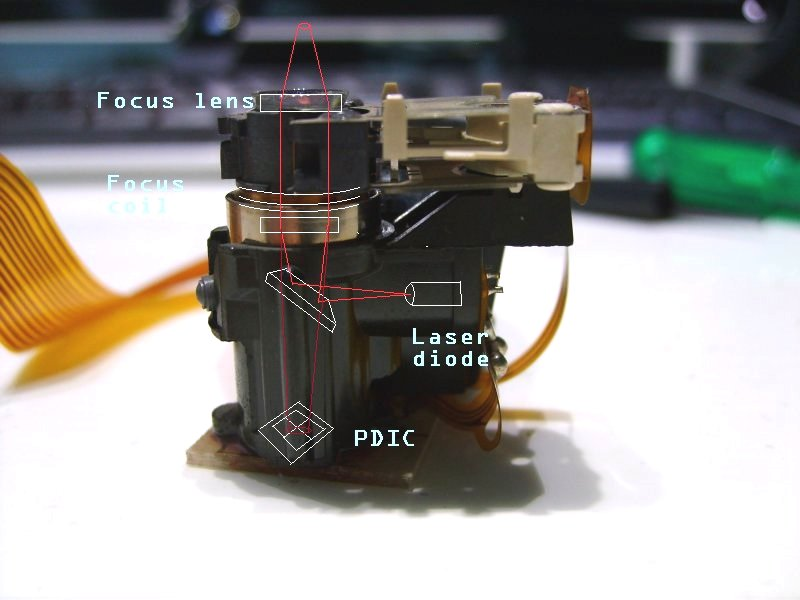
Philips one-beam laser assembly

The swing-arm mechanism has a distinctive advantage over the other in that it does not skip when the rail becomes dirty. The swing-arm mechanisms tend to have a much longer life than their radial counterparts. The main difference between the two mechanisms is the way they read the data from the disc. The swing-arm mechanism uses a magnetic coil wound over a permanent magnet to provide the tracking movement to the laser assembly in a similar way a hard drive moves its head across the data tracks. It also uses another magnetic movement mechanism attached to the focusing lens to focus the laser beam on the disc surface. By operating the tracking or the focus actuators, the laser beam can be positioned on any part of the disc. This mechanism employs a single laser beam and a set of four photodiodes to read, focus, and keep track of the data coming from the disc.

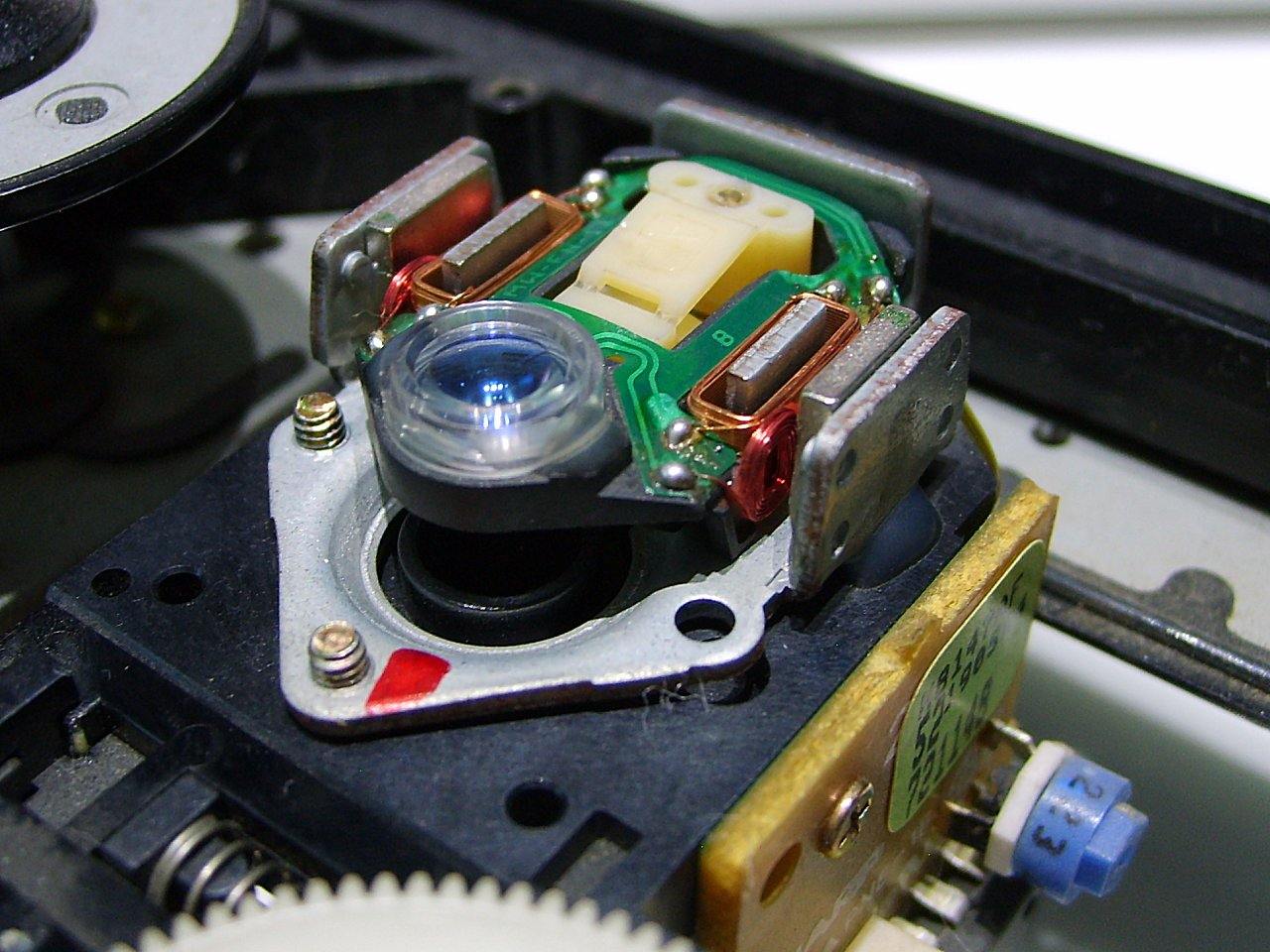
Sharp laser optical assembly. All six focusing and tracking coils can be seen.

The linear tracking mechanism uses a motor and reduction gears to move the laser assembly radially across the tracks of the disc, and it also has a set of six coils mounted in the focusing lens over a permanent magnetic field. One set of two coils moves the lens closer to the disc surface, providing the focusing motion, and the other set of coils moves the lens radially, providing a finer tracking motion. This mechanism uses the three-beam tracking method in which a main laser beam is used to read and focus the data track of the disc using three or four photodiodes, depending on the focus method, and two smaller beams read the adjacent tracks at each side to help the servo keep the tracking using two more helper photodiodes.

== Mechanical components ==
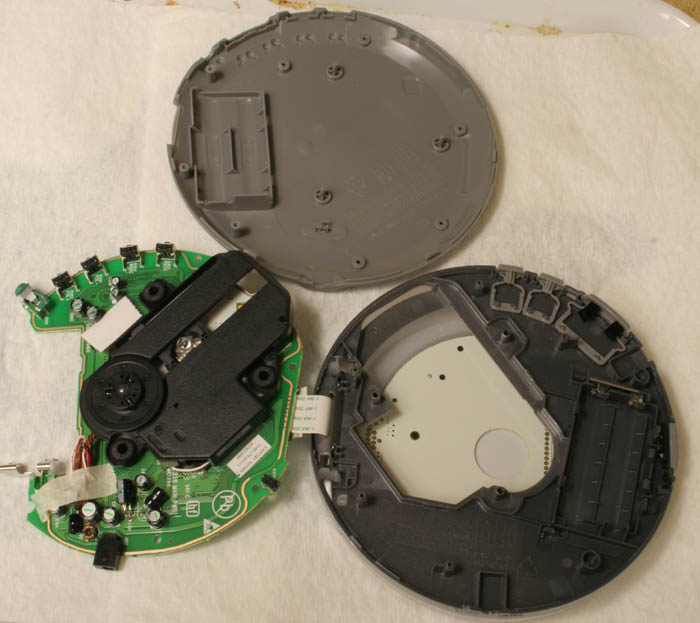
Philips Portable CD player disassembled

A CD player has three major mechanical components: a drive motor, a lens system or pickup head, and a tracking mechanism. The drive motor (also called spindle) spins the disc to a scanning velocity of 1.2–1.4 m/s (constant linear velocity) – equivalent to approximately 500 RPM at the inside of the disc, and approximately 200 RPM at the outside edge. (A disc played from beginning to end slows its rotation rate during playback.) The tracking mechanism moves the lens system along the spiral tracks in which information is encoded, and the lens assembly reads the information using a laser beam produced by a laser diode. The laser reads information by focusing a beam on the CD, which is reflected off the disc's mirrored surface back to a photodiode array sensor. The sensor detects changes in the beam, and a digital processing chain interprets these changes as binary data. The data are processed and eventually converted to sound using a DAC.

A table of contents (TOC) is located after the lead-in area of the disc, which is located in an inner ring of the disc and contains roughly five kilobytes of available space. It is the first information that the player reads when the disc is loaded in the player and contains information on the total number of audio tracks, the running time on the CD, the running time of each track, and other information such as ISRC and the format structure of the disc. The TOC is of such vital importance for the disc that if it is not read correctly by the player, the CD cannot be played back. That is why it is repeated three times before the first music program starts. The lead out area in the end (the outer peripheral) of the disc tells the player that the disc has come to an end.

== CD player features ==
CD players can employ a number of ways to improve performance, reduce component count or price. Features such as oversampling, one-bit DACs, dual DACs, interpolation (error correction), anti-skip buffering, digital and optical outputs are, or were, likely to be found. Other features improve functionality, such as track programming, random play and repeat, or direct track access. Yet others are related to the CD player's intended target, such as anti-skip for car and portable CD players, pitch control and queuing for a DJ's CD player, remote and system integration for household players. Description of some features follows:

- Oversampling is a way to improve the performance of the low pass filter present at the output of most CD players. By using a higher sampling frequency, a multiple of the 44.1 kHz used by CD encoding, it can employ a filter with much lower requirements.
- One-bit DACs were less expensive than other types of DACs, while providing similar performance.
- Dual DACs were sometimes advertised as a feature because some of the early CD players used a single DAC, and switched it between channels. This required additional supporting circuits, possibly degrading sound quality.
- Anti-skip, Antishock, or electronic skip protection is a way for the CD player to avoid interrupting the audio output when mechanical shock is experienced by the disc playback mechanism. It consists of an additional data processor and a RAM chip installed on the player that reads the disc at double speed and stores various frames of audio data in a RAM memory buffer for later decoding. Some players may compress the audio data prior to buffering to use lower capacity (and less expensive) RAM chips. Typical players can store about 44 seconds of audio data on a 16 Mbit RAM chip.

== Portable CD players ==
=== Small portable players ===
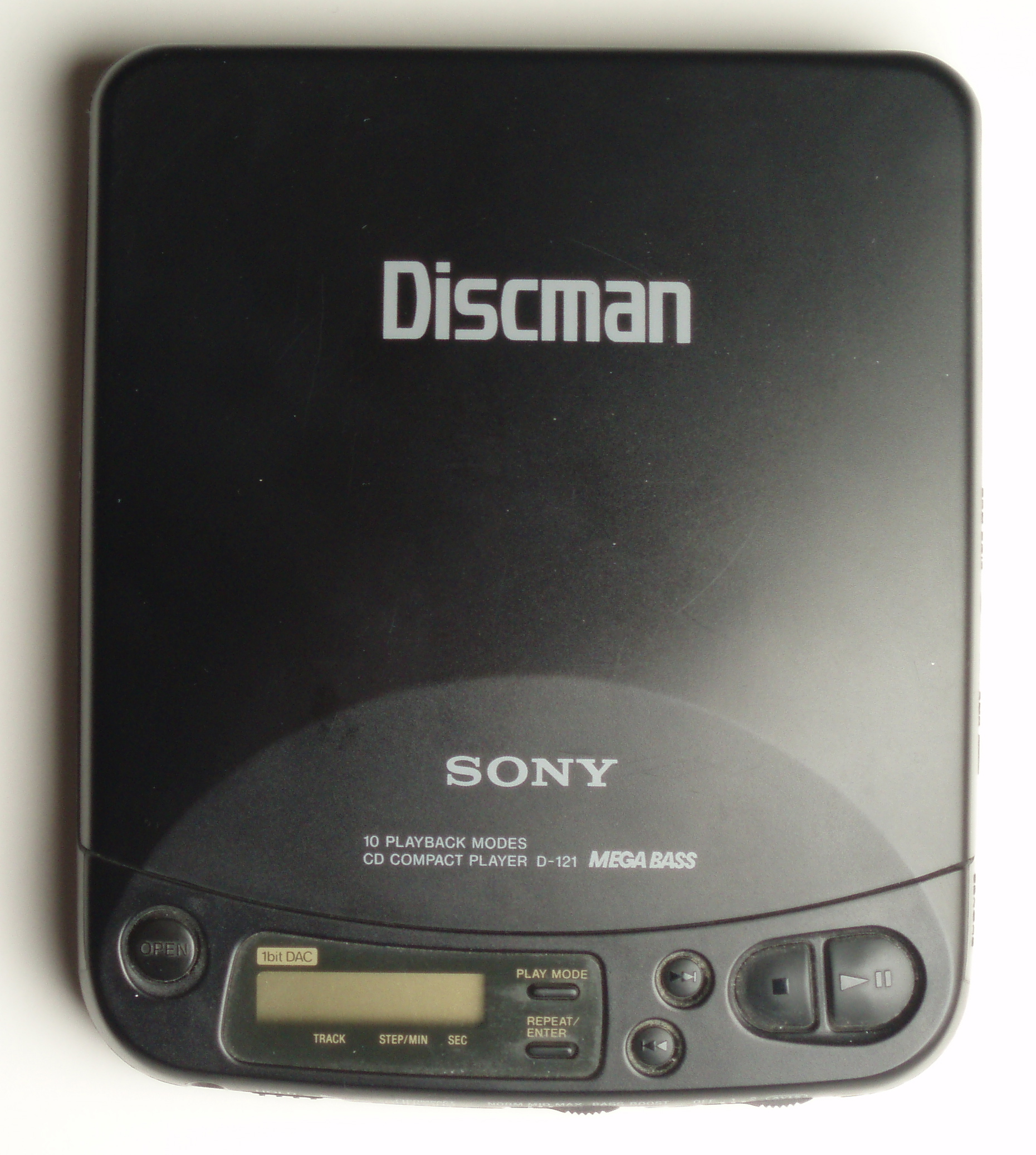
An early portable player, a Sony Discman model D-121

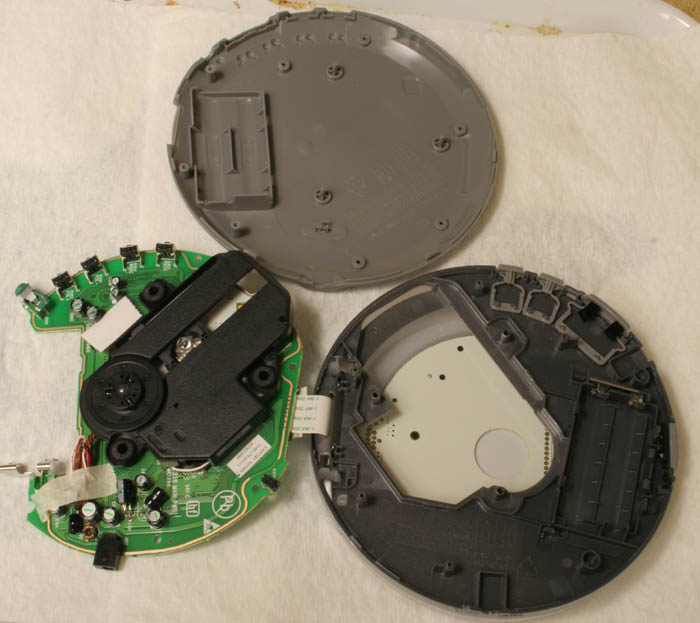
A Philips portable CD player disassembled

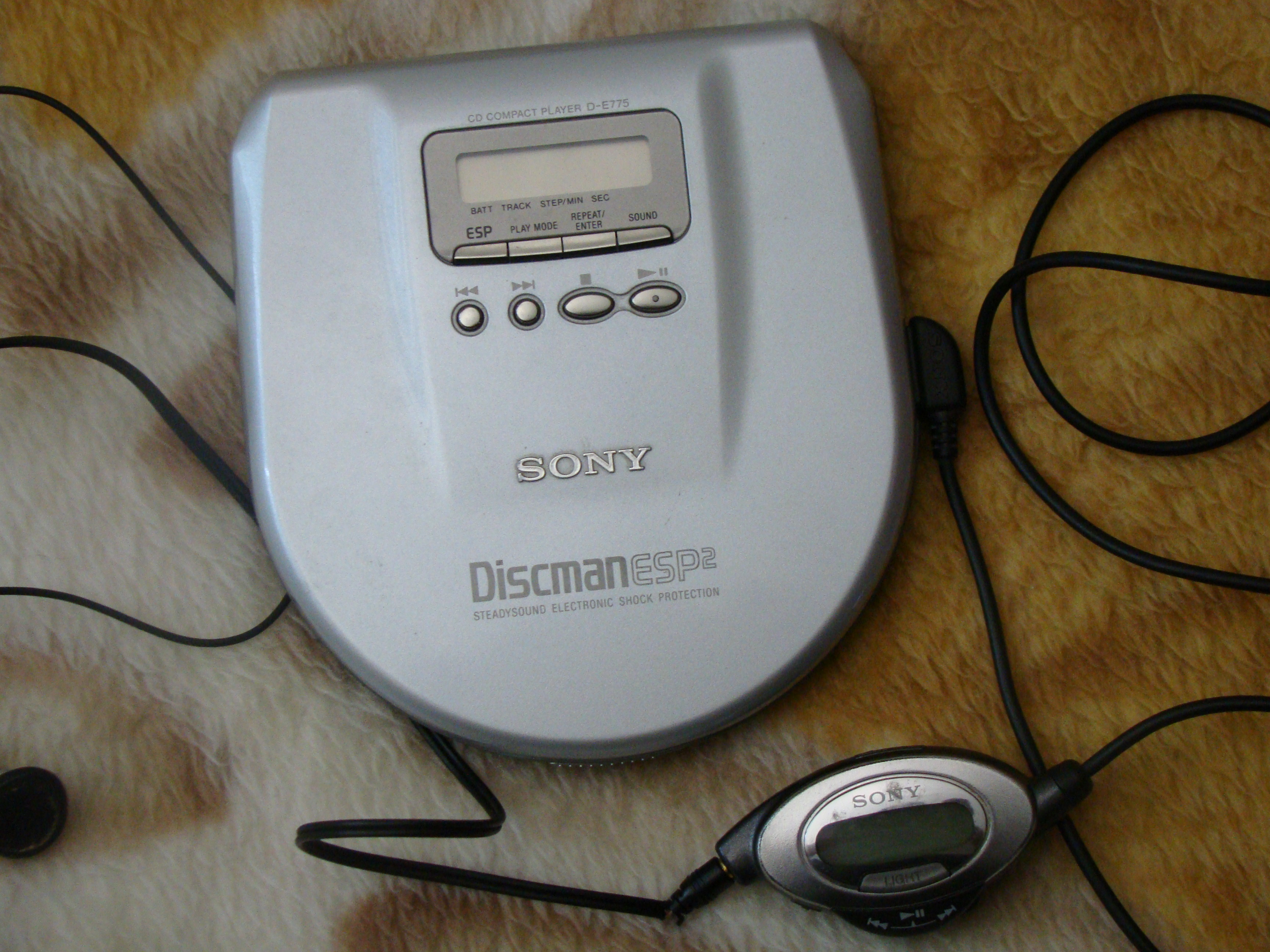
Attached controller to facilitate playback control

A portable CD player is a portable audio player used to play compact discs. Portable CD players are powered by batteries and they have a 1/8" headphone jack into which the user plugs a pair of headphones. The first portable CD player released was the D-50 by Sony. The D-50 was made available on the market in 1984, and adopted for Sony's entire portable CD player line.

In 1998, portable MP3 players began to compete with portable CD players. After Apple Computer entered the music player market with its iPod line, within ten years it became the dominant seller of portable digital audio players, "...while former giant Sony (maker of the [portable] Walkman and [CD] Discman [was] struggling." This market shift was initiated when the first portable digital audio player, the Rio digital music player, was introduced. The 64 MB Rio MP3 player enabled users to store about 20 songs. One of the benefits of the Rio over portable CD players was that since the Rio had no moving parts, it offered skip-free playback. Since 1998, the price of portable digital audio players has dropped and the storage capacity has increased significantly. In the 2000s, users can "carry [their] entire music collection in a [digital audio] player the size of a cigarette package." The 4 GB iPod, for example, holds over 1,000 songs. By the early 2010s, MP3 players began to decline in popularity, in favour of downloading music on platforms such as iTunes, and later streaming music on platforms such as Spotify, Apple Music, and YouTube Music.

=== Boomboxes ===
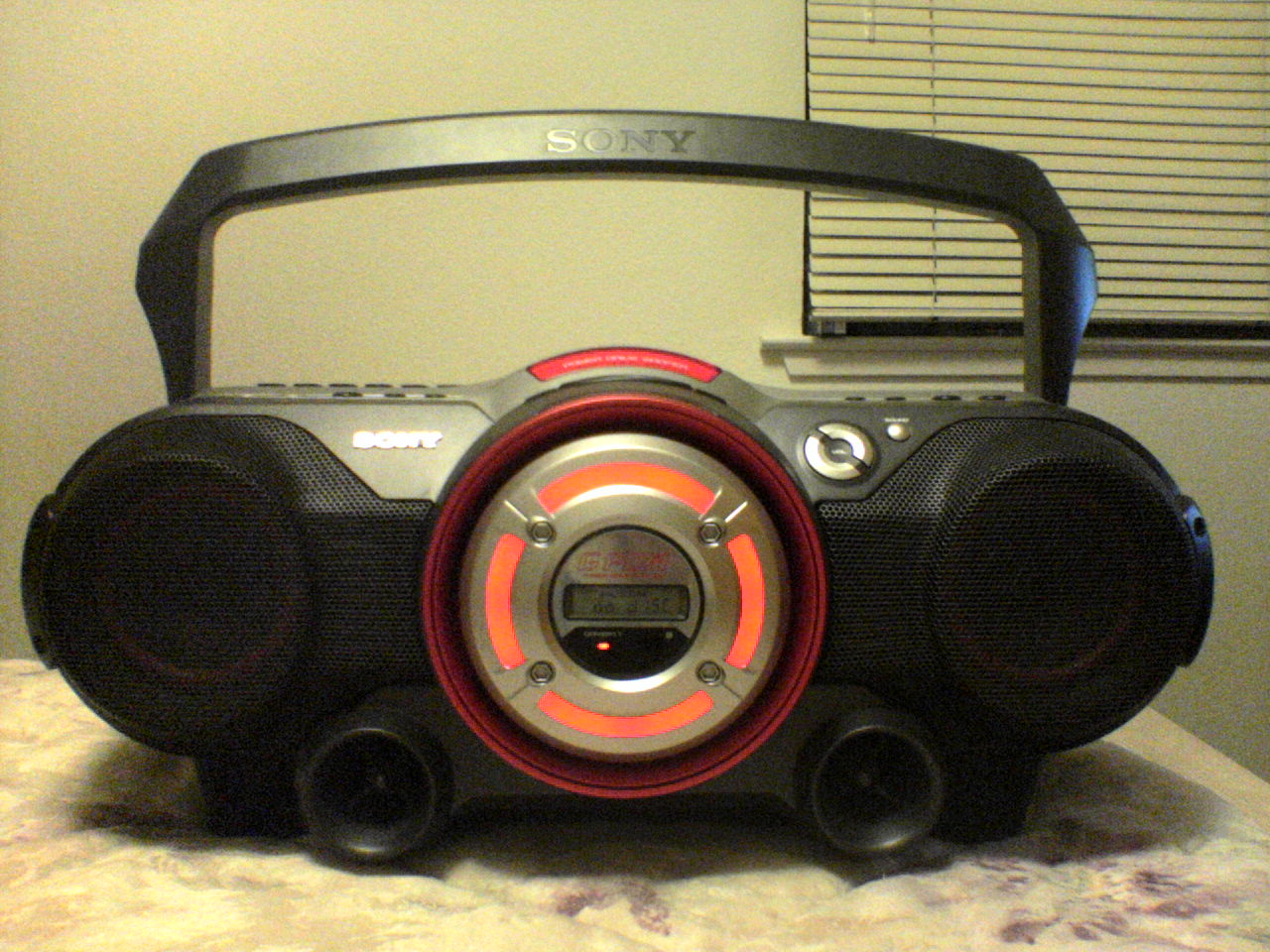
A Sony CD boombox from 2005

A boombox is a common term for a portable cassette and AM/FM radio that consists of an amplifier, two or more loudspeakers and a carrying handle. Beginning in the 1990s, boomboxes typically included a CD player. The boombox CD player is the only type of CD player that produces sound audible by the listener independently, without the need for headphones or an additional amplifier or speaker system. Designed for portability, boomboxes can be powered by batteries as well as by line current. The boombox was introduced to the American market during the mid-1970s. The desire for louder and heavier bass led to bigger and heavier boxes; by the 1980s, some boomboxes had reached the size of a suitcase. Most boomboxes were battery-operated, leading to extremely heavy, bulky boxes.

Most boomboxes from the 2010s typically include a CD player compatible with CD-R and CD-RW, which allows the user to carry their own music compilations on a higher fidelity medium. Many also permit iPod and similar devices to be plugged into them through one or more auxiliary input jacks. Some also support formats such as MP3 and WMA. Another modern variant is a DVD player/boombox with a top-loading CD/DVD drive and an LCD video screen in the position once occupied by a cassette deck. Many models of this type of boombox include inputs for external video (such as television broadcasts) and outputs to connect the DVD player to a full-sized television.

== DJ equipment ==
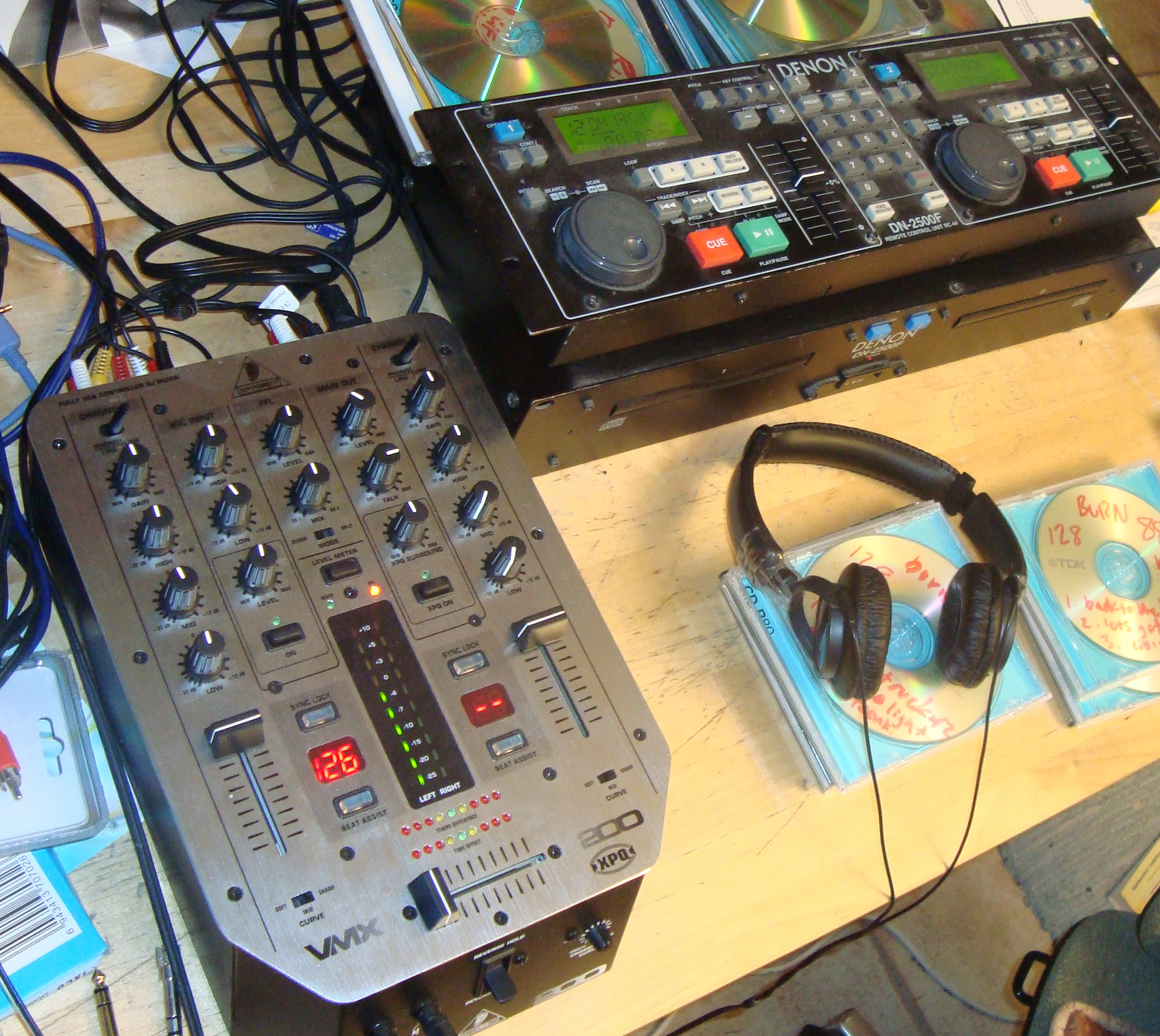
This example of a CD player used by DJs is the Denon DN-2500 dual CD player, on the right side of the picture. A Behringer VMX-200 DJ mixer is also shown in the left side, in the foreground.

Disc jockeys (DJs) who are playing a mix of songs at a dance club, rave, or nightclub create their dance mixes by having songs playing on two or more sound sources and using a DJ mixer to transition seamlessly between songs. In the 1970s disco era, DJs typically used two record players. From the 1980s to the 1990s, two compact cassette players became a popular sound source for DJs. In subsequent decades, DJs shifted to CDs and then to digital audio players. DJs who use CDs and CD players typically use specialized DJ CD players (such as CDJs) that have features not available on regular CD players, such as pitch control.

DJs who are performing scratching–the creation of rhythmic sounds and sound effects from sound recordings–traditionally used vinyl records and turntables. In the 2010s, some specialized DJ CD players could be used to create scratching effects using songs on CDs.

== See also ==
- Compact Cassette
- High-end audio
- Jukebox
- List of compact disc player manufacturers
- MP3 CD
- Optical disc drive
- Radio cassette
- Radio receiver, includes information about Radio CD/DVD.
- Record changer
- Transport (recording)
