= Electronic skip protection =

CD player data buffer system

Electronic skip protection is a data buffer system used in some portable compact disc (CD) players and all MiniDisc (MD) units so that audio will not be disrupted if the disk cannot be read due to movement.

== Technology ==
When the buffering circuitry is in operation, the compact disc is read at a fixed read speed or CAV and the content is buffered (with optional ADPCM compression) and fed to RAM within the player. The audio content is read from RAM, optionally decompressed, and then sent to the digital-to-analog converter. When the disc reading is interrupted, the player momentarily reads the data stored in RAM while the tracking circuitry finds the passage prior to the interruption on the CD.

Another method has the disc rotating at variable or CLV speed (the normal rotation method for a CD player), but at a slightly higher speed than with the buffer feature switched off. The buffer method is the same as before.

== History ==
The technology surfaced around 1995 as a physically smaller alternative to the bulky rubber shock absorbers utilized in portable players at the time. It reduced the size of the hitherto bulky players designed for use in moving cars, in particular. Small rubber shock absorbers are still used, but are less effective than the larger pre-1995 ones.

When first introduced, 3 seconds was the maximum buffering time. In 2006, the time generally ranged from 10 seconds to "skip-free", where the player will rarely skip due to a large buffer.

Due to the nature of the ATRAC compression scheme, and to ensure uninterrupted playback in the presence of fragmentation, all MD decks and portables buffered at least 10 seconds when the format was introduced in 1992. As of 2006, MD units have much bigger buffers.

As Flash-based MP3 players then smartphones eventually replaced CD for portable applications, electronic skip protection is no longer needed, as players such as the new players with no moving parts do not require it.

== Attributes ==
The skip protection system offers interruption-free playback, allowing listeners to enjoy their music without disruptions from movement or jolts. However, this feature comes with certain trade-offs. The audio quality may experience some degradation in systems that use compression to reduce memory requirements. Additionally, battery life is reduced because the memory buffer requires additional power to operate. This battery impact was particularly pronounced in older players manufactured between 1992 and 1997, which experienced battery life reductions of up to fifty percent when skip protection was enabled. Players produced from 1997 onward incorporated more power-efficient skip protection technology, lessening this drawback.

== Trade names ==
"ESP", "Anti-Skip", "Anti-Shock", "Joggable" "G-Protection" (Used by Sony), etc.
