= Sony CDP-101 =

First commercially released CD player

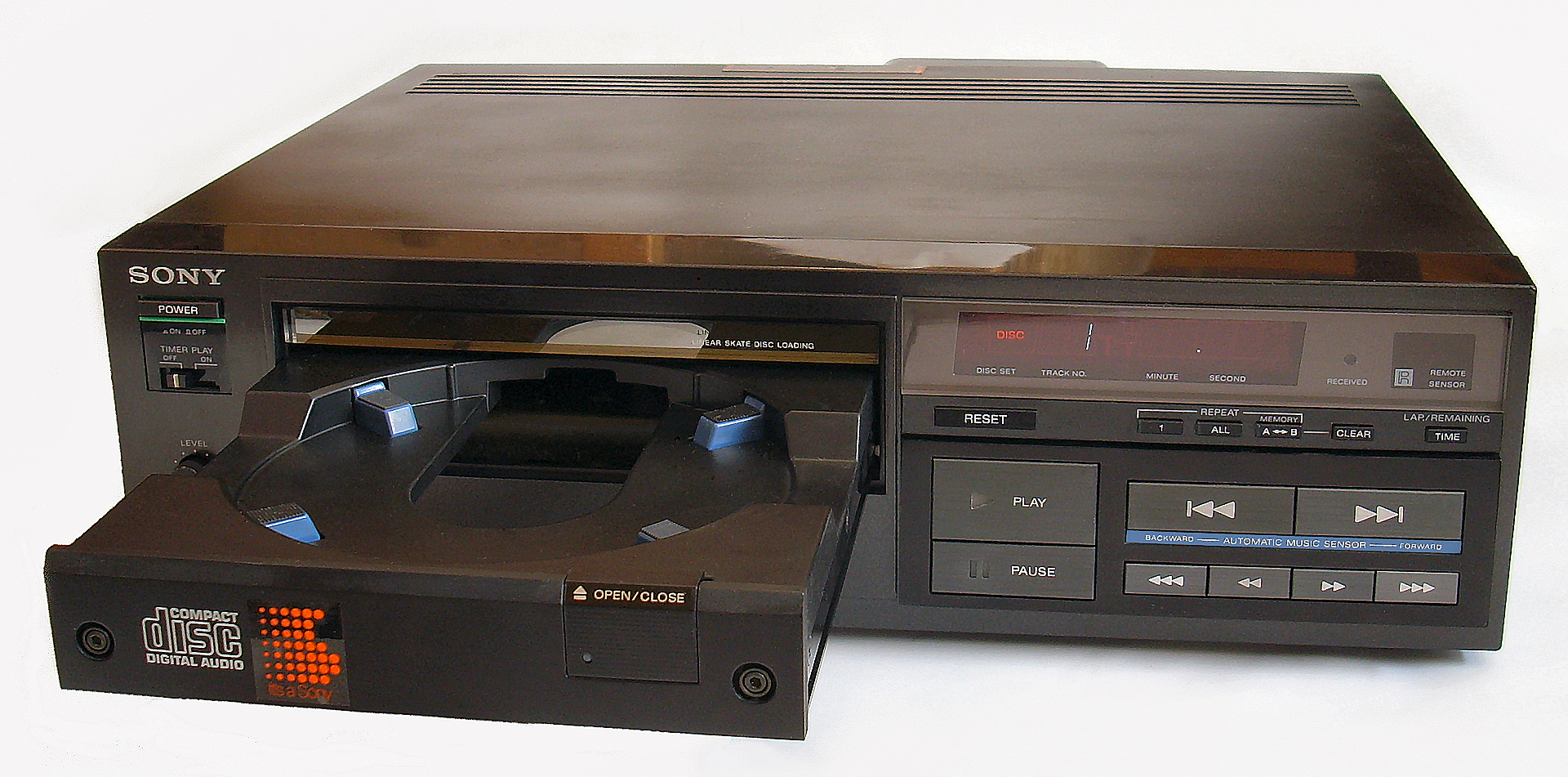
- Manufacturer: Sony Corporation
- Type: CD player
- Retail availability: 1982–1985

The Sony CDP-101 was the world's first commercially released compact disc player. The system was launched in Japan on October 1, 1982 at a list price of 168,000 yen (approx US$730).

The Japan-only launch was partially because Philips, Sony's partner in the development of the CD format, was unable to meet the original agreed launch date. Rather than agree to a full postponement, Sony agreed to delay the launch of the format outside Japan by six months. The Philips CD100 launched in the US and European markets in March 1983, although early Philips players contained some Sony components.

In line with the agreement, the system was launched worldwide in March 1983.

== Design ==
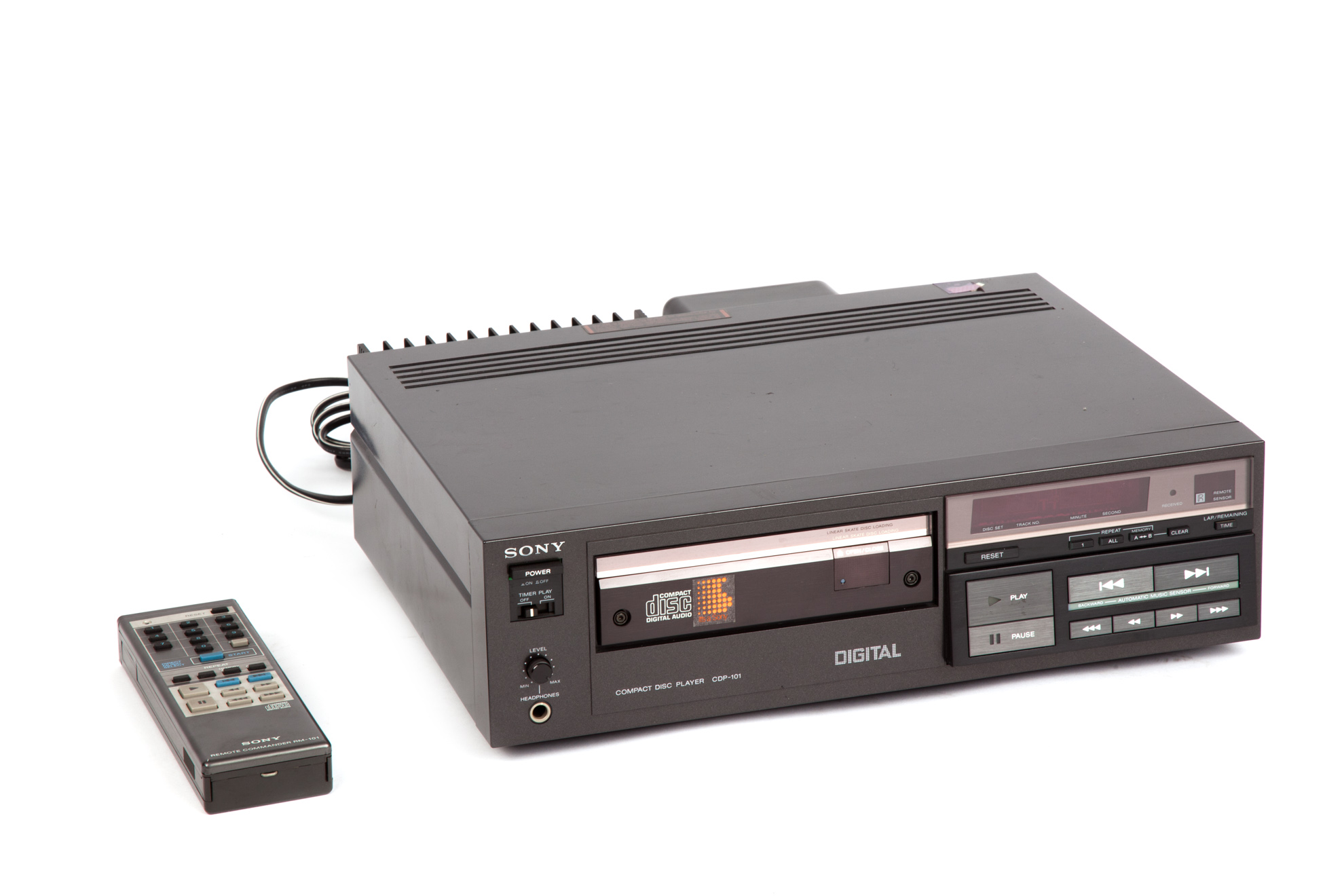
CD player Sony CDP-101 on display at the Museo della Scienza e della Tecnologia Leonardo da Vinci, Milan

Demonstration CD players from Sony had the disc placed vertically in the machine allowing the CD face to be visible through a transparent front whilst playing. The CDP-101 instead opted for a horizontal tray-loading system. The case and front panel of the system were manufactured from plastics.

The front of the unit featured a vacuum fluorescent display panel to provide information such as track number and playing time, an infrared receiver for the included remote control, and buttons to control playback, open and close the tray and toggle the display between showing elapsed and remaining playing time. The only dial was for adjusting the volume level of a 1/4" headphone jack.

At the back of the unit there are two on/off switches, one labeled Auto Pause and the other Anti Shock. There are two RCA jacks to carry left and right channels of audio; a 26-pin accessory connector is included, presumably for future developments that did not materialize. There is also a heatsink on the back.

The remote control unit, RM-101, has most of the same buttons as the main system. It omits the open/close button and display toggle, but has numbered buttons unlike the main unit, that allow a particular track number to be selected.

The model name CDP-101 was chosen by Nobuyuki Idei, who headed Sony's Audio Division. "101" represents the number 5 in binary notation and was chosen because Idei considered the model to be of "medium class".

== Technical ==
Because of the high cost of digital-to-analogue converters ("DACs") at the time, the CDP-101 has only one DAC for both the left and right audio channels. There is no sample-and-hold circuitry to delay the first channel until the other is ready, so the left and right channels are out of sync by approximately 11 μs. The output voltage is 2V RMS.

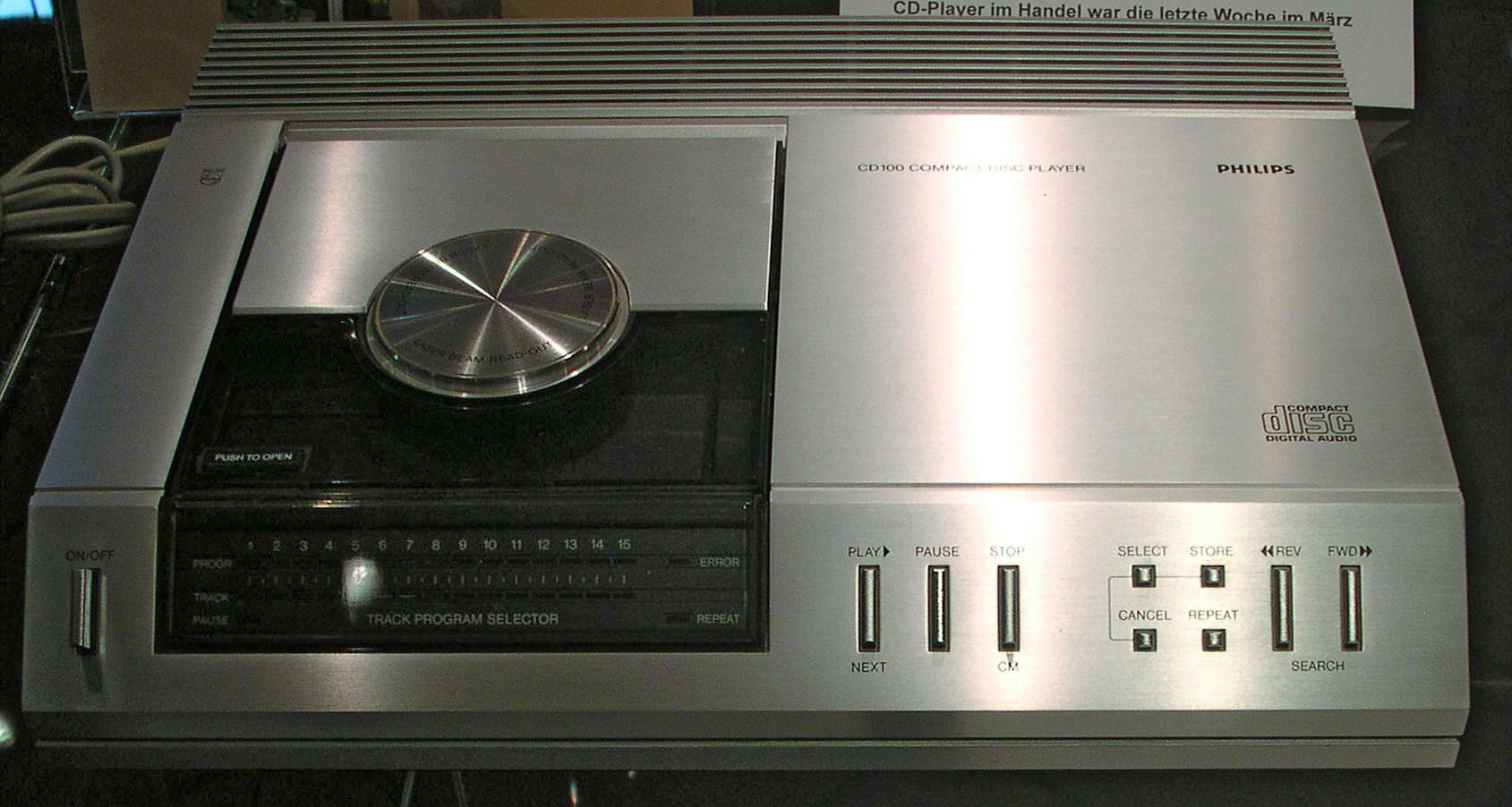
Philips's CD-100

Unlike the Philips CD100 which uses oversampling to enable the use of a 14-bit DAC, the CDP-101 features a 16-bit DAC that was designed and manufactured in-house by Sony. The decision to use 16-bit CD encoding was made at Sony's insistence, because Philips had already developed a 14-bit DAC, and Sony was worried that would allow Philips to get their product to market first if 14-bit encoding had been chosen.

== Legacy ==
Sony continued to produce CD players, with models such as the CDP-30 following soon after.

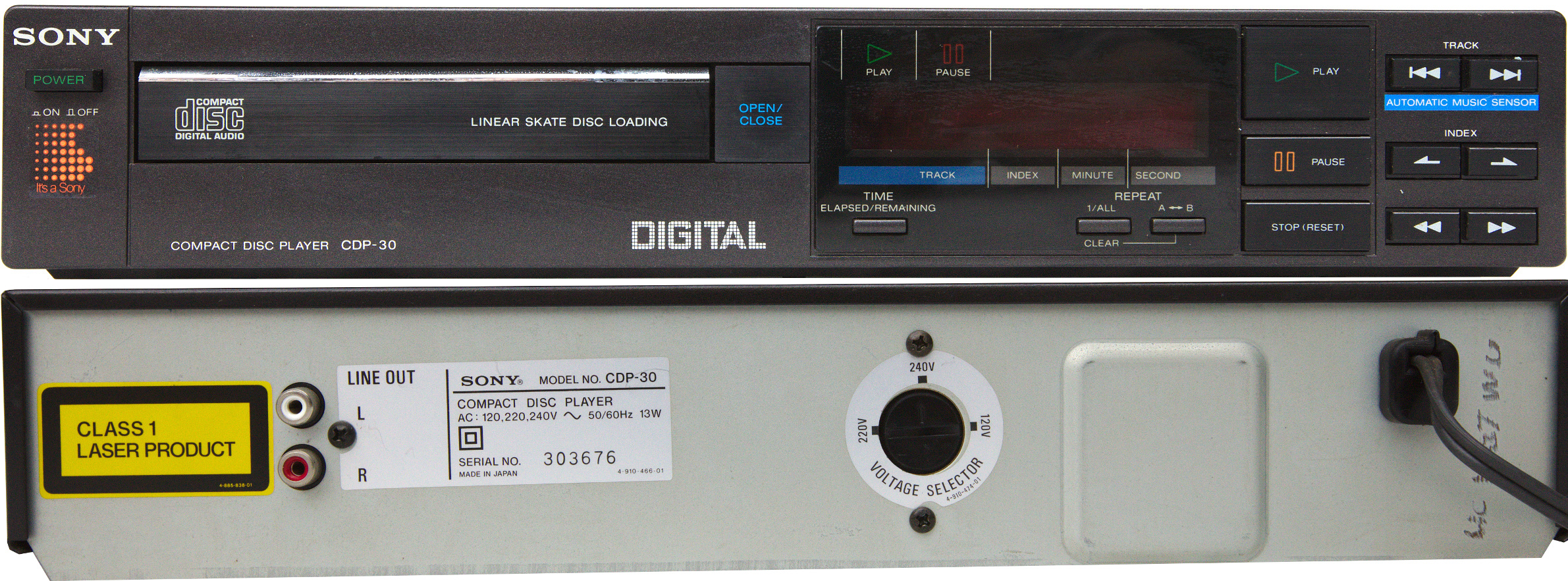
Front and rear views of the Sony CDP-30 CD player (produced circa 1984-1986).
