= Heitaro Nakajima =

Heitaro Nakajima Heitaro Nakajima
- Born: 21 March 1921
- Died: 9 December 2017 (aged 96)
- Engineering career
- Discipline: Electrical engineer

Heitaro Nakajima (中島 平太郎, Nakajima Heitarō; 19 March 1921 – 9 December 2017) was a Japanese digital audio pioneer, who led Sony's Compact Disc project in the 1970s.

Born in Kurume, Fukuoka Prefecture, Nakajima graduated from the Tokyo Institute of Technology with a bachelor's degree in electrical engineering in 1944, and earned a Doctor of Engineering degree from Kyushu University in 1958.

In 1971, Nakajima joined Sony as a managing director, hired by Sony's co-founder and president at large, Masaru Ibuka. He became president of Aiwa in 1984. In 1989, he received the first IEEE Masaru Ibuka Consumer Electronics Award and in 1993 he was awarded the Purple Ribbon Medal for CD development.
