= Violin Concerto (Mendelssohn) =

1844 composition by Felix Mendelssohn

- by Felix Mendelssohn
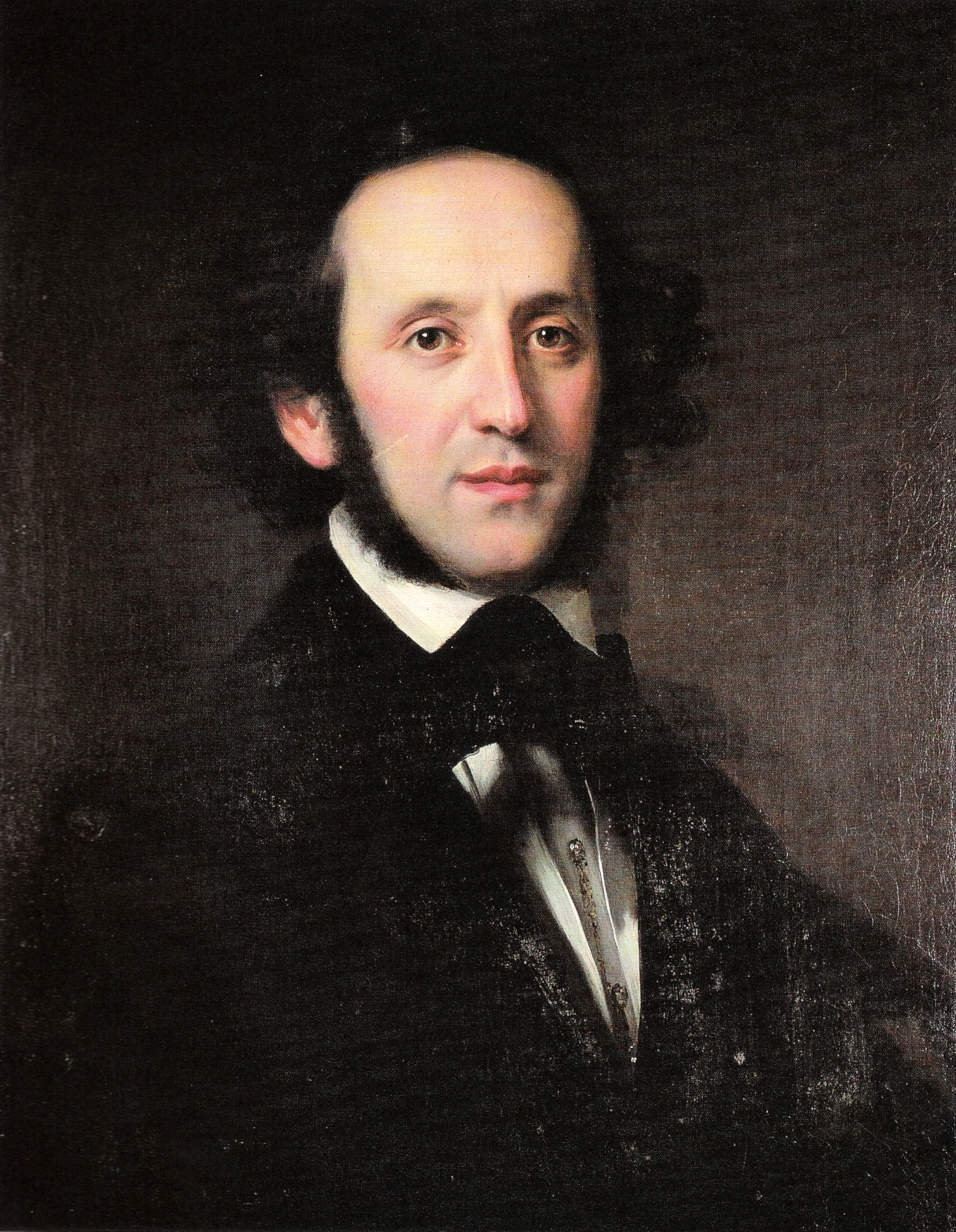
- Mendelssohn in 1846 by Eduard Magnus
- Key: E minor
- Opus: 64
- Year: 1844
- Period: Romantic
- Genre: Concerto
- Composed: 1838–1844
- Movements: 3
- Scoring: Violin and orchestra

Premiere
- Date: 13 March 1845
- Location: Leipzig

Felix Mendelssohn's Violin Concerto in E minor, Op. 64, MWV O 14, is his last concerto. It was well received at its premiere and has remained as one of the most prominent and highly regarded violin concertos in history. It holds a central place in violin repertoire and has developed a reputation as an essential concerto for all aspiring concert violinists to master. A typical performance lasts just under half an hour.

Mendelssohn originally proposed the idea of the violin concerto to Ferdinand David, a close friend and concertmaster of the Leipzig Gewandhaus Orchestra. Although conceived in 1838, the work took another six years to complete and was not premiered until 1845. During this time, Mendelssohn maintained a regular correspondence with David as he gave him many suggestions throughout the creation process. The work itself was one of the foremost violin concertos of the Romantic era and was influential on many other composers.

Although the concerto consists of three movements in a standard fast–slow–fast structure that follow a traditional form, it was innovative and included many novel features for its time. Distinctive aspects include the almost immediate entrance of the violin at the beginning of the work and the through-composed form of the concerto as a whole, in which the three movements are melodically and harmonically connected and played attacca.

Many violinists have recorded this concerto and it is performed in concerts and classical music competitions. It was recorded by Nathan Milstein and the New York Philharmonic as an album and released as the first LP record upon the format's introduction in 1948.

== History ==
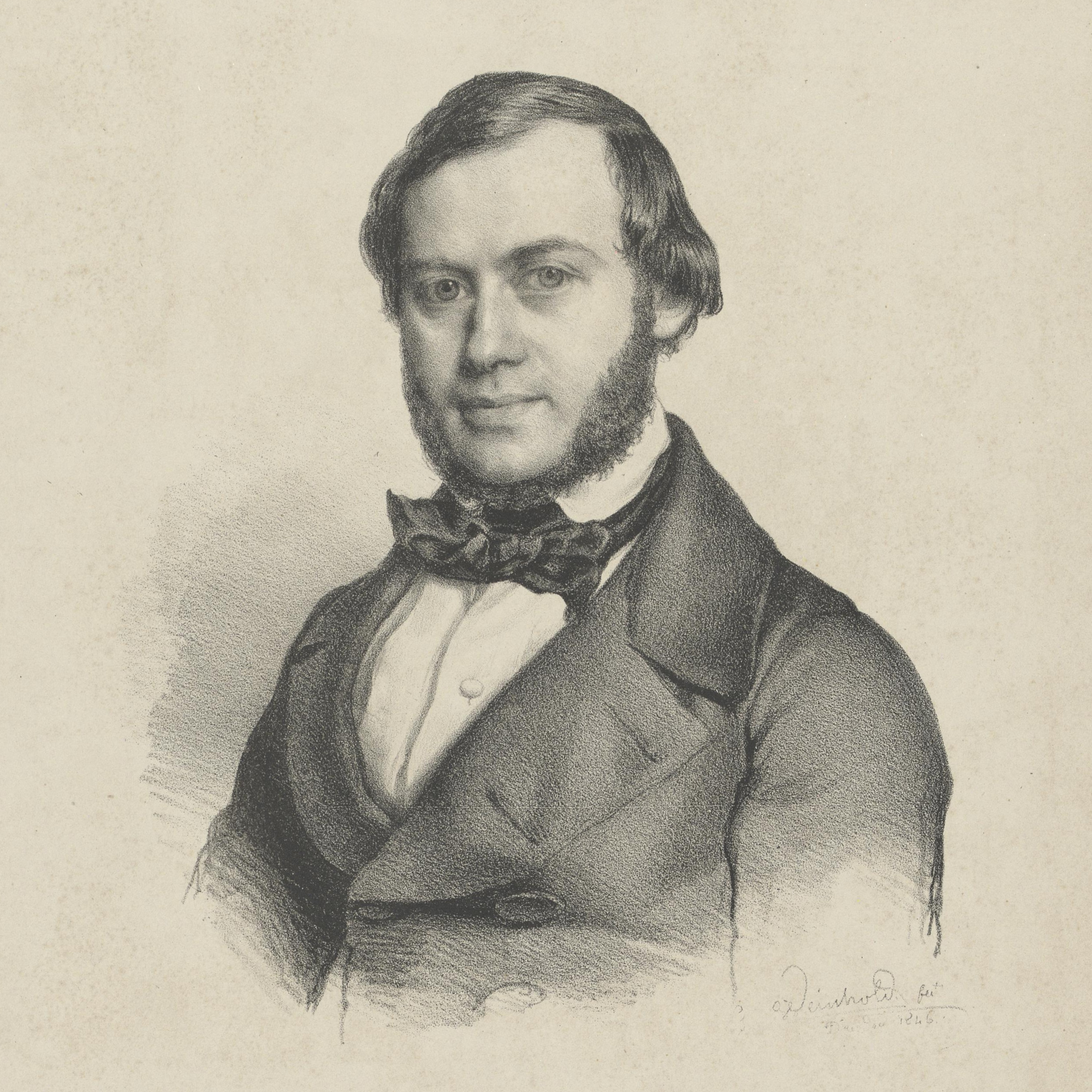
Ferdinand David, the violinist who premiered the piece and whose collaboration was essential for the concerto's birth

Following his appointment in 1835 as principal conductor of the Leipzig Gewandhaus Orchestra, Mendelssohn named his childhood friend Ferdinand David as the orchestra's concertmaster. The work's origins derive from this professional collaboration. In a letter dated 30 July 1838, Mendelssohn wrote to David:

I should like to write a violin concerto for you next winter. One in E minor runs through my head, the beginning of which gives me no peace.

The concerto took another six years to complete. There are many possible reasons for the delay, including self-doubt, his third symphony and an unhappy period in Berlin after a request from King Frederick William IV of Prussia. Nevertheless, Mendelssohn and David kept up a regular correspondence during this time, as Mendelssohn sought technical and compositional advice from David. This violin concerto was the first of many to have been composed with the input of a professional violinist, and this choice would influence many future collaborations between violinists and composers. The autograph score is dated 16 September 1844, but Mendelssohn was still seeking advice from David until its eventual premiere. The concerto was first performed in Leipzig on 13 March 1845 with Ferdinand David as soloist. Mendelssohn was unable to conduct due to illness and the premiere was conducted by the Danish composer Niels Gade. Mendelssohn first conducted the concerto on 23 October 1845 again with Ferdinand David as soloist.

An autograph manuscript of the concerto re-emerged in 1989 in the Biblioteka Jagiellonska in Kraków, leading to some scholarly scepticism of the veracity of Breitkopf & Härtel's 1862 edition of the published score. Some notable differences include the tempo character of the first movement being handwritten as "Allegro con fuoco" (meaning: with fire) rather than the published "Allegro molto appassionato" (very impassioned) as well as significant differences in the solo violin's passage-work.

== Instrumentation ==
The concerto is scored for solo violin and a standard orchestra of its period, consisting of two flutes, two oboes, two clarinets in A, two bassoons, two natural horns, two natural trumpets, timpani, and strings.

== Movements ==
The concerto consists of three movements with the following tempo markings:

1. Allegro molto appassionato (E minor)
2. Andante (C major)
3. Allegretto non troppo – Allegro molto vivace (E major)

=== I. Allegro molto appassionato ===
12–14 minutes

I. Allegro molto appassionato
Performed by the Hankyung Arte Philharmonic

Instead of an orchestral tutti, the concerto opens with the almost immediate entry of the solo violin, playing the very tune in E minor that gave Mendelssohn no peace. Following a bravura of rapidly ascending notes, the opening theme is then restated by the orchestra. There is then a frenetic chromatic transition passage as the music subsides and modulates into a tranquil second subject theme in G major. The melody is initially played by the woodwinds with the soloist providing a pedal note on an open G string. The tune is played by the solo violin itself before a short codetta ends the exposition section of the opening movement.

The opening two themes are then combined in the development section, where the music builds up to the innovative cadenza, which Mendelssohn wrote out in full rather than allowing the soloist to improvise. The cadenza builds up speed through rhythmic shifts from quavers to quaver-triplets and finally to semiquavers that require ricochet bowing from the soloist. This serves as a link to the recapitulation, where the opening melody is played by the orchestra, accompanied by the continuing ricochet arpeggios by the soloist. During the recapitulation, the opening themes are repeated with the second theme being played in the E major before returning to E minor for the closing of the movement. The music gathers speed into the coda that is marked as "Presto", before a variant of the original chromatic transition passage ends the first movement.

=== II. Andante ===
7–9 minutes

II. Andante

The bassoon sustains its B from the final chord of the first movement before moving up a semitone to middle C. This serves as a key change from the fast-paced, intense E minor opening movement into the lyrical C major slow movement. The movement is in ternary form and is reminiscent of Mendelssohn's own Songs Without Words. The theme to the darker, middle section in A minor is first introduced by the orchestra before the violin then takes up both the melody and the accompaniment simultaneously. The tremulous accompaniment requires nimble dexterity from the soloist before the music returns to the main lyrical C major theme, this time leading towards a serene conclusion.

=== III. Allegretto non troppo – Allegro molto vivace ===
6–7 minutes

III. Allegretto non troppo – Allegro molto vivace

Following the second movement, there is a brief fourteen-bar transitional passage in E minor for solo violin and strings only. This leads into the lively and effervescent finale, the whole of which is in E major and whose opening is marked by a trumpet fanfare. This movement is in sonata rondo form with an opening theme requiring fast passage work from the soloist. The opening exposition leads into a brief second B major theme which is played by the soloist and builds to a series of rapidly ascending and descending arpeggios, reminiscent of the cadenza from the first movement.

The orchestra then plays a variation of the opening melody, after which the music moves into a short development section in G major. The recapitulation is essentially similar to the exposition apart from the addition of a counter-melody in the strings. The second theme is repeated, but this time in the home key of E major. There is almost a small cadenza near the end of the movement when the woodwinds play the main tune against prolonged trills from the solo violin. The concerto then concludes with a frenetic coda.

== Analysis ==
This concerto is innovative in many respects. In the first movement alone, Mendelssohn departs from the typical form of a Classical concerto in many ways. The most immediate change is the entry of the soloist almost from the outset, which also occurs in his First Piano Concerto. Although the first movement is mostly in the conventional sonata form, Mendelssohn has the first theme played by the solo violin as the introduction which is followed by the orchestra. Classical concertos typically opened with an orchestral introduction followed by a version of the same material that incorporates the soloist.

The cadenza is also novel in that it is written out as part of the concerto and located before the recapitulation. In a typical Classical concerto, the cadenza is improvised by the performing soloist and is located at the end of a movement after the recapitulation while also just before the final coda. Mendelssohn's written cadenza was not included in the first published version of the concerto, but instead found in a "streamlined" version by Ferdinand David without the contrapuntal complexity of the original. This is the most played version today, although some artists, e.g. Arabella Steinbacher and Chouchane Siranossian, chose to play Mendelssohn's original.

This violin concerto stands out from previous concertos with its connected movements. There is no break between the first and second movements as a bassoon note is held between the two. The bridging passage between the last two movements begins almost immediately after the slow movement. The melody is similar to that of the opening, which hints at the cyclic form of the piece. The linking was designed to eliminate applause between movements. This would have come as a surprise to Mendelssohn's audience as they were used to applauding between movements.

The concerto also calls on the soloist to function as an accompanist to the orchestra for extended periods, such as the ricochet arpeggios at the start of the recapitulation. This too was novel for a violin concerto of its time.

== Legacy ==
Mendelssohn's Violin Concerto influenced the concertos of many other composers, who adopted aspects of it in their own concertos.

For example, the unusual placement of the cadenza before the recapitulation is reflected in the violin concerto of Tchaikovsky where the cadenza is similarly placed and in the violin concerto of Sibelius where the cadenza serves to extend the development section. Moreover, following this concerto it was rare for a composer to leave a cadenza unwritten for the soloist to improvise such as in the classical works of Mozart and Beethoven. The linking of the three movements also influenced other concertos, such as Liszt's Second Piano Concerto.

The concerto itself was an instant success as it was warmly received at its premiere and well received by contemporary critics. By the end of the nineteenth century, the piece was already considered one of the greatest violin concertos in the repertoire. It would become one of Mendelssohn's most popular pieces, and was still regularly performed even when interest in his music declined in the early twentieth century. In 1906, the year before his death, the celebrated violinist Joseph Joachim told the guests at his 75th birthday party:

The Germans have four violin concertos. The greatest, most uncompromising is Beethoven's. The one by Brahms vies with it in seriousness. The richest, the most seductive, was written by Max Bruch. But the most inward, the heart's jewel, is Mendelssohn's.

The work has developed a reputation as an essential one for aspiring violin virtuosi to conquer. This has led to its becoming virtually ubiquitous in the discography of concert violinists. Today, the violin concerto remains technically challenging and is generally considered to be as difficult as many other famous counterparts.

== Bibliography ==
- Keefe, Simon P., ed. (2005). The Cambridge Companion to the Concerto. Cambridge Companions to Music. Cambridge: Cambridge University Press. doi:10.1017/ccol9780521834834. ISBN 978-0-521-54257-9.
- Kerman, Joseph (1999). Concerto conversations. The Charles Eliot Norton lectures. Cambridge, Mass: Harvard University Press. ISBN 978-0-674-15891-7.
- Lindeman, Steve (2004). "The works for solo instrument(s) and orchestra". In Mercer-Taylor, Peter (ed.). The Cambridge Companion to Mendelssohn. Cambridge Companions to Music. Cambridge: Cambridge University Press. doi:10.1017/ccol9780521826037. ISBN 978-0-521-82603-7.
- Mercer-Taylor, Peter, ed. (2004). The Cambridge Companion to Mendelssohn. Cambridge Companions to Music. Cambridge: Cambridge University Press. doi:10.1017/ccol9780521826037. ISBN 978-0-521-82603-7.
- Steinberg, Michael (15 October 1998). The Concerto: A Listener's Guide. Oxford University Press. doi:10.1093/oso/9780195103304.001.0001. ISBN 978-0-19-772934-2.
- Stowell, Robin (1992). "The concerto". In Stowell, Robin (ed.). The Cambridge Companion to the Violin. Cambridge Companions to Music. Cambridge: Cambridge University Press. doi:10.1017/ccol9780521390330. ISBN 978-0-521-39033-0.
