= Mendelssohn Violin Concerto (Nathan Milstein album) =

Studio album by Nathan Milstein
- Released: 1948
- Genre: Classical
- Label: Columbia

The recording of the Mendelssohn Violin Concerto by Nathan Milstein and the New York Philharmonic Orchestra conducted by Bruno Walter was the first classical long-playing record, and the first 12" LP of any kind, in 1948.

The issue marked Columbia Records' move away from the 78 rpm format for classical, and the success of Columbia's format soon forced RCA to follow suit. The recording had already been released as Columbia Masterworks Set M-MM-577 in 1945. The first LP sleeve, a flimsy kraft paper top open envelope, carried the Steinweiss artwork from the earlier 78 rpm album MM-577.

Milstein's playing in the concerto, which was already familiar in the concert hall, received wide critical acclaim.

There are a number of other recordings of Milstein playing the concerto. In addition to the 1945 recording with Walter, he was recorded in a 1946 Library of Congress performance with piano accompaniment by Joseph Blatt, in an April 1962 telecast with Walter Hendl and the Chicago Symphony Orchestra, with the London Philharmonia Orchestra under Léon Barzin, with the Pittsburgh Symphony under William Steinberg for Capitol, and in 1973 for Deutsche Grammophon with the Vienna Philharmonic conducted by Claudio Abbado.

== See also ==
- Album era
