= Direct Stream Digital =

System for digitally encoding audio signals

- Media type: Audio recording process; Disc format
- Encoding: Pulse density modulation
- Read mechanism: DSD
- Write mechanism: Super Audio CD
- Standard: ISO/IEC 14496-3
- Usage: Audio recording
- Extended to: present
- Released: 1999

Direct Stream Digital (DSD) is a trademark used by Sony and Philips for their system for digitally encoding audio signals for the Super Audio CD (SACD).

DSD uses delta-sigma modulation, a form of pulse-density modulation encoding, a technique to represent audio signals in digital format, a sequence of single-bit values at a sampling rate of 2.8224 MHz. This is 64 times the CD audio sampling rate of 44.1 kHz, but with 1-bit samples instead of 16-bit samples. Noise shaping of the 64-times oversampled signal provides low quantization noise and low distortion in the audible bandwidth necessary for high resolution audio.

DSD is simply a format for storing a delta-sigma signal without applying a decimation process that converts the signal to a PCM signal.

== Development ==
DSD technology was developed and commercialized by Sony and Philips, the designers of the audio CD. However, in 2005, Philips sold its DSD tool division to Sonic Studio.

Major label support

DVD-Audio was endorsed by the Warner Music Group, while the SACD format was endorsed by Sony and Universal Music Group, with an especially high-profile by UMG imprint Virgin Records. Despite this, in 2011, The Warner Premium Sound series of albums was released by Warner Music Group, marking the first time the label released titles in a SACD format, with recording in DSD. The series grew to ten rock and pop albums, with Super Audio CD/CD hybrid discs containing both an SACD layer and a standard CD layer.

Sony did not promote SACD actively in North America, with the result that DVD-Audio gained competitive traction in the market. Elsewhere, such as in Europe or Japan, SACD gained more of a foothold. Examples include the German Stockfisch Records, which releases vinyl editions of albums and DSD-recordings, released as hybrid SACDs.

Independent label use

Music companies that specialize in Super Audio CD products therefore use DSD encoding. A number of independent record labels have also worked directly with Sony to focus on DSD products or the DSD recording process.

DMP Digital Music Products was an early user of the SACD digital audio format. In 1997 their release Alto by Joe Beck & Ali Ryerson was the first commercial recording captured with Sony's DSD recording technology. The label's Just Jobim by Manfredo Fest in 1998 was the first project captured with the new Meitner DSD conversion technology. In 2000, DMP released the world's first multi-channel SACD—Sacred Feast by Gaudeamus.

The majority of Telarc International Corporation's releases were on (generally hybrid) SACD, and are DSD recordings. Telarc often worked with early audiophile company Soundstream, and re-released many of its original Soundstream recordings in SACD format. Soundstream, which made the first digital recording in the United States, recorded in 16-bit PCM at a sample rate of 50 kHz via its own proprietary digital recorder. This 50 kHz PCM format was converted to DSD for release on Telarc SACD.

The record label Mobile Fidelity had engineers who decided to adopt the SACD over the DVD-Audio disc as a favored high-resolution digital format after listening tests and technical evaluations. On the label's Hybrid SACD releases, the SACD layer is a direct DSD recording of the analog master tape, while the CD layer is a digital down conversion of the DSD, with Super Bit Mapping applied. Post-2001, CD-only releases are sourced from DSD, but omit the SACD layer.

In 2007, Blue Coast Records was founded in California for the purpose of recording and releasing music recorded with the DSD format, primarily focusing on jazz and acoustic artists.

On August 28, 2013, the Acoustic Sounds label launched SuperHiRez.com (now defunct), which sold mainstream albums from major record labels that were produced with Direct Stream Digital or PCM audio formats. On September 4, 2013, Acoustic Sounds announced an agreement with Sony Music Entertainment to provide the company's new digital download service with albums that have been produced or remastered in DSD format.

The format is used on albums such as Pop, Songs & Death in 2009, and the remastered The Rolling Stones album Their Satanic Majesties Request in 2002.

== DSD signal format ==
Comparison with zero-order hold PCM

DSD differs from the PCM format used by compact disc or typical computer audio systems: while PCM uses a multi-bit value (representing a large range of amplitudes) at a low sample rate, DSD instead uses a single-bit value (representing an increase or decrease in amplitude) at a sample rate much higher than the signal's bandwidth.

The process of creating a DSD signal is the same as the front-end modulator and noise-shaper portion of a 1-bit delta-sigma analog-to-digital converter (ADC), without the back end decimator (which would typically convert the 1-bit bitstream into multi-bit PCM). The short-term average of the 1-bit DSD bitstream signal is proportional to the original signal amplitude. Because of the higher sample rate, an SACD player can use a one-bit DAC with a low-order analog filter to reconstruct and produce the analog output.

DSD uses noise shaping techniques to push quantization noise up to inaudible ultrasonic frequencies above 20 kHz. Because of this, single-rate DSD64 can deliver a dynamic range of 120 dB from 20 Hz to 20 kHz. SACD marketing also claimed an extended frequency response up to 100 kHz, (Note: Most recent SACD players specify an upper limit of 50 to 90 kHz) but at those high frequencies any sound, if present, is drowning in ultrasonic noise generated by noise shaping. The practical limit is 20 or 30 kHz, where ultrasonic noise starts rising. Around 1999 when SACD premiered, amplifiers, headphones and speakers typically had a frequency response up to 20 kHz, and SACD players were supplied without any filtering, assuming speakers and headphones would not reproduce this ultrasonic noise. Later invention of super tweeters and extension frequency response of speakers and headphones up to 40 kHz and amplifiers up to 100 kHz motivated designers of SACD/DSD players to include a 24 kHz filter to block this noise at the output.

The various DSD formats use sampling rates well into the megahertz (MHz) range, typically with an oversampling ratio that is a power of two relative to the 44.1 kHz rate used for CD audio:

| Name | Abbreviation | Sample rate | Oversampling ratio relative to 44.1 kHz | Notes |
|---|---|---|---|---|
| Single-rate DSD | DSD64 | 2.8224 MHz | 64× | The format used for SACD media. |
| Double-rate DSD | DSD128 | 5.6448 MHz | 128× | Since its establishment, content creators have made DSD128 recordings available, such as the audiophile label Opus3. |
| Quad-rate DSD | DSD256 | 11.2896 MHz | 256× | The format used by Mobile Fidelity for LP mastering |
| Octuple-rate DSD | DSD512 | 22.5792 MHz | 512× | |
| Sexdecuple-rate DSD | DSD1024 | 45.1584 MHz | 1024× | |

See delta-sigma modulation § Theoretical effective number of bits for analysis of the effective number of bits that can be achieved by oversampling, especially when using a higher order modulator.

== DSD mixing and mastering ==
DSD music mixing and mastering for SACD or Internet download presents challenges due to the difficulty of performing digital signal processing (DSP) operations (such as equalization, balance, panning) in a one-bit environment.

Older analog recordings were processed using analog equipment and then digitized to DSD. It is also possible to avoid processing by using only the available adjustments in the studio equipment while recording to DSD.

One DSP technique available is to convert the DSD to PCM and use standard PCM equipment such as Pro Tools, useful for rock and contemporary music, which rely on multitrack techniques, then digitally convert back to DSD format. Some DSD proponents dislike this technique, claiming that the PCM conversion to a lower sample rate reduces the sound quality of DSD.

A format and set of tools for PCM processing of DSD has been developed under the name Digital eXtreme Definition (DXD). This is a PCM format with 24-bit resolution sampled at 352.8 kHz. Another DSP technique uses a format commonly referred to as DSD-wide, which retains the high sample rate of standard DSD, but uses 8-bit samples with noise shaping. DSD-wide is sometimes disparagingly referred to as PCM-narrow. It has the benefit of making DSP operations practical while retaining the 2.8224 MHz sampling frequency. The processed DSD-wide signal is converted to the final 1-bit DSD product at the same sample rate. Processing DSD-wide at the higher multiple-DSD sample rates is also possible. Pyramix and some SADiE digital audio workstation (DAW) systems can operate in the DSD-wide domain.

=== DSD processing tools ===
DXD was initially developed for the Merging Technologies Pyramix workstation and introduced together with their Sphynx 2, AD/DA converter in 2004. This combination meant that it was possible to record and edit directly in DXD, and that the sample only converts to DSD once before publishing. This offers an advantage to the user as the noise created by converting DSD rises dramatically above 20 kHz, and more noise is added each time a signal is converted back to DSD during editing.

The Pyramix Virtual Studio Digital Audio Workstation allows for recording, editing and mastering all DSD formats up to DSD256. A 12.288 MHz DSD256 variant based on a 48 kHz reference (Note: 48 kHz × 256 = 12.288 MHz as opposed to the more common 44.1 kHz × 256 = 11.2 MHz) is supported. The exaSound e20 DAC was the first commercially available device capable of DSD256 playback at sampling rates of 11.2896 or 12.288 MHz. The Merging Technologies Horus AD/DA Converter offers sample rates up to 11.2 MHz, or four times the SACD rate.

DSD128, 5.6448 MHz, twice the SACD rate, has been supported by multiple hardware devices such as the exaSound e20 Mk II DA,C Korg MR-1000 1-bit digital recorder, Amanero Combo384 DSD output adapter and the discontinued exaU2I USB to I²S interface.

Software supporting DSD includes Sonic Studio's Amarra Luxe, Audirvana, foobar2000 with SACD plugin, JRiver Media Center, Roon, HQPlayer and Neutron Music Player are all able to handle DSD files of up to DSD512 rate fully natively.

== DSD playback options ==
Sony developed DSD for SACD, and many disk players support SACD. Since the format is digital, there are other ways to play back a DSD stream; the development of these alternatives has enabled companies to offer high-quality music downloads in DSD.

=== DSD disc format ===
Some professional audio recorders (from Korg, Tascam, and others) can record in DSD format. Transferring this signal to a recordable DVD with the appropriate tools, such as the AudioGate software bundled with Korg MR-2000S recorder, renders a DSD Disc. Such discs can be played back in native DSD only on certain Sony VAIO laptops and PlayStation 3 systems. Sony produced two SACD players, the SCD-XA5400ES and the SCD-XE800, that fully support the DSD-disc format. In June 2012, Pioneer launched a series of SACD players compatible with DSD disc. The PD-30 and PD-50. In January 2013, TEAC announced a DSD-disc compatible player, the PD-501HR.

=== DSD over USB ===
An alternative to burning DSD files onto disks for eventual playback is to transfer the (non-encrypted) files from a computer to audio hardware over a digital link such as USB. The USB audio 2.0 specification defined several formats for the more common PCM approach to digital audio, but did not define a format for DSD.

In 2012, representatives from many companies and others developed a standard to represent and detect DSD audio within PCM frames; the standard, commonly known as DSD over PCM (DoP), is suitable for other digital links that use PCM. The 1.1 revision added protocol support for higher DSD sample rates without requiring an increase the underlying PCM sample rate.

=== Native DSD ===
The definition of native DSD playback is somewhat a matter of philosophy. Generally speaking, it avoids the conversion of DSD data into multibit PCM anywhere along the reproduction chain. Many commercially available DACs now support native DSD.

== DSD vs. PCM ==
There has been much controversy between proponents of DSD and PCM over which encoding system is superior. In 2000, Lipshitz and Vanderkooy stated that one-bit converters, as employed by DSD, are unsuitable for high-end applications due to their high distortion. In 2002, Philips published a paper arguing the contrary. Lipshitz and Vanderkooy's paper was further criticized by Angus. Lipshitz and Vanderkooy responded to the criticisms. Stuart also defined sigma-delta modulation a "totally unsuitable choice" for high-resolution digital audio.

Conventional implementation of DSD has an intrinsic high distortion. Distortion can be alleviated to some degree by using multibit DACs. State-of-the-art ADCs are based on sigma-delta modulation designs. Oversampling converters are usually used in linear PCM formats, where the ADC or DAC output is subject to bandlimiting and dithering. Most modern ADC and DAC converters use oversampling and a multi-bit design; in other words, while DSD is a 1-bit format, modern converters internally use a 2-bit to 6-bit format.

Comparisons of DSD and PCM recordings with the same origin, number of channels and similar bandwidth and noise have yielded contradictory results. A 2004 study conducted at the Erich-Thienhaus Institute in Detmold, Germany, found that in double-blind tests "hardly any of the subjects could make a reproducible distinction between the two encoding systems." In contrast, a 2014 study conducted at the Tokyo University of the Arts found that listeners could distinguish PCM (192 kHz/24 bits) from either DSD (2.8 MHz) or DSD (5.6 MHz) (but not between the two DSD samplings), preferring the sound of DSD over PCM: "For example, Drums stimulus of DSD (5.6 MHz) has p = 0.001 when compared against PCM (192 kHz/24 bit) in overall preference. This suggests that DSD version was statistically significantly preferred over the PCM version." These findings are questionable however, because "the two formats were subject to different processing, most notably, different filtering of the low-frequency content."

Even though DSD-based SACD was more successful than its direct competitor, the PCM-based DVD-Audio, DSD met with relatively little success in the consumer market. Direct manipulation of recorded DSD data is difficult due to the limited availability of appropriate software. The advent of new high-resolution PCM standards, such as DXD, further restricted DSD's market niche.

== DSD file formats ==
There are several ways to store DSD encoded audio as files on a computer. One option is to use DSD native file formats used specifically for this purpose. Alternatively, DSD can be stored in general-purpose audio formats officially adapted to support DSD storage. Finally, DSD audio can be embedded into PCM audio streams that do not have special DSD support. However, a special decoder is needed to recover the DSD stream from these PCM files.

=== DSD Interchange File Format ===
DSD Interchange File Format
- Filename extension: .dff
- Internet media type: audio/x-dff
- Developed by: Philips
- Latest release: 1.5; 2004-27-04
- Type of format: DSD Audio
- Website: https://sonicstudio.com/pdf/dsd/DSDIFF_1.5_Spec.pdf

DSD Interchange File Format (DSDIFF) is a native DSD file format developed by Philips between 2000 and 2004 for storage of DSD recordings. The format supports DST compression of the payload as well as annotations used in Super Audio CD production. A single DSDIFF file may store an entire album as a single audio stream together with markers indicating the location of individual tracks for the album. Some parts of the audio content may be left out entirely from the resulting SACD. The embedded metadata format is intended for mastering engineers, not consumers. For example, markers indicating the beginning of a new audio track have a text field for storing arbitrary text-based information. However, there is no requirement for the text to contain the title of the track. A de facto standard for including ID3 metadata in an unofficial ID3 chunk was later developed as consumers adopted the format for storing individual tracks of DSD audio. DSDIFF files typically use the .dff file suffix. No official media type has been registered for the DSDIFF file format. Freedesktop.org uses the unofficial media types audio/x-dff.

=== Wideband Single-bit Data ===
Wideband Single-bit Data
- Filename extension: .wsd
- Internet media type: audio/x-dsf
- Developed by: 1-bit Audio Consortium
- Type of format: DSD Audio

Wideband Single-bit Data (WSD) is a native DSD file format developed by 1-bit Audio Consortium in 2002. The consortium was established by Waseda University, Sharp and Pioneer a year earlier. In 2012 the consortium published an updated 1.1 version of the specification. The WSD header has a field for storing an absolute timestamp in samples since midnight. The timestamp makes it possible to accurately know how much time passed between two recordings made consecutively on the same physical recording device. Korg portable recorders MR-1, MR-2, MR-1000 and MR-2000s support WSD alongside other DSD based formats.

=== DSD Stream File ===
DSD Stream File
- Filename extension: .dsf
- Internet media type: audio/x-dsf
- Developed by: Sony
- Latest release: 1.01; November 2005
- Type of format: DSD Audio
- Website: https://dsd-guide.com/sonys-dsf-file-format-spec

DSD Stream File (DSF) is a native DSD file format developed by Sony around 2005. The format is intended for storing individual tracks of DSD audio and has native support for ID3 metadata inclusion. The format defines a format ID field that could presumably be used to indicate DST compression. However, the only identifier defined in the spec is number 0, indicating DSD raw. Files containing DSF data would typically use the.dsf file suffix. No official media type has been registered for the DSF file format. Freedesktop.org uses the unofficial media types audio/x-dsf.

=== DSD compatible file formats ===
DSD-compatible file formats support storing DSD-encoded audio in addition to audio encoded as PCM.

WavPack is a generic audio storage format supporting various different forms of audio. Compressed DSD audio is also supported by the format. The DSD support was initially introduced with the release of WavPack software suite version 5 in December 2016. Files containing WavPack data would typically use the.wv file suffix. No official media type has been registered for the WavPack file format. Freedesktop.org uses the unofficial media types audio/x-wavpack. Since WavPack supports multiple formats, the suffix or mime type alone does not indicate the presence of DSD audio.

=== DSD over PCM (DoP) ===
In addition to actual DSD file formats, a format called DSD Audio over PCM Frames (DoP) is used for embedding DSD into PCM audio streams. DoP makes it possible to circumvent any PCM-only component in the playback chain that would prevent a DSD-capable DAC from receiving the raw DSD data required for native DSD playback. While DoP is intended to be a wire protocol used for communication between a music player application and a DAC, there exist tools that can embed DoP-encoded DSD into FLAC files, enabling users to use a non-DSD capable player for DSD playback with their DoP-capable DAC. A DoP stream is designed to sound like low-volume noise when played back by a PCM-only DAC, while a DoP-capable DAC will detect the presence of DSD data, extract it from the PCM and play it back as DSD.

== See also ==
- Audio bit depth
- Glossary of digital audio
- Super Bit Mapping (SBM)
- Timeline of audio formats
