= Glossary of digital audio =

This is a glossary of terms used in digital audio, covering common audio formats, codecs, technical specifications, and related concepts. The terms listed here relate to the storage, compression, encoding, and playback of digital sound, and are widely used in consumer electronics, music production, and broadcasting.

== A~C ==
AAC
Advanced Audio Coding is a standardized, lossy compression and encoding scheme for digital audio. Designed to be the successor of the MP3 format, AAC generally achieves better sound quality than MP3 at similar bit rates.
AC-3
Audio Coding 3 is a 6-channel, audio file format by Dolby Laboratories that usually accompanies DVD viewing. It operates 5 channels for normal range speakers (20 to 20,000 Hz) and the 6th channel reserved for low-frequency (20 to 120 Hz) sub-woofer operation. AC3 increases fidelity over its previous surround sound standard, Pro-logic, with independent tracks for each of the 6 speakers, a 16-bit depth at 48 kHz sampling rate with a maximum bit rate of 640 kbit/s.
AIFF
Audio Interchange File Format is an audio file format standard used for storing sound data for personal computers and other electronic audio devices. The format was developed by Apple Computer.
ALAC
Apple Lossless Audio Codec is an audio codec developed by Apple Inc. for lossless data compression of digital music.
Audio bit depth
Bit depth or sample resolution is the number of bits of information recorded for each sample. Bit depth directly corresponds to the resolution of each sample in a set of digital audio data. Common examples of bit depth include CD quality audio, which is recorded at 16 bits, SACD with effective 20-bit resolution, and DVD-Audio, which can support up to 24-bit audio.
Bit rate
Represents the amount of information, or detail, that is stored per unit of time of a recording. Common examples of bit rates include MP3 which is recorded at 128–320 kbits/s, CD quality audio (LPCM) which is recorded at 1,411.2 kbit/s, SACD (DSD) which is recorded at 5,644.8 kbit/s, and DVD-Audio (MLP), which is recorded at 18,000 kbit/s.
CD
Compact Disc is a 16-bit, 44.1 kHz system, giving a frequency response of 5 to 22,000 Hz and 96 dB dynamic range.

== D ==
DFF
The format used for SACD mastering and 5.1-channel downloads – file extension for DSDIFF files
DSD
Direct Stream Digital is a 1-bit method of storing audio on digital media. The audio format used for Super Audio CDs (SACD) with effective 20-bit resolution.
DSDIFF
Direct Stream Digital Interchange File Format – Format for the storage or exchange of one-bit delta sigma modulated audio, often called Direct Stream Digital, or for the losslessly compressed version called Direct Stream Transfer (DST).
DSF
Direct Stream File is a stereo-only, simplified form of DFF — a 1-bit, 2-channel audio file format developed and used by Sony for their VAIO personal and laptop computers equipped with Sound Reality Sigma-Delta DAC. It is also used as a 1-bit professional audio file format for SACD production.
DST
Direct Stream Transfer is lossless compression; part of MPEG-4; used for SACD
DTS
A series of multichannel audio technologies owned by DTS, Inc. (formerly known as Digital Theater Systems, Inc.). DTS supports bit rates up to 1,534 kbit/s, sampling rates up to 48.0 kHz and bit depths up to 24 bits.
DVD-A
DVD-Audio is a digital format for delivering high-fidelity audio content on a DVD. DVD-A is capable of frequencies from 0 to 96 kHz with a maximum dynamic range of 144 dB.
Dynamic range
The ratio of the amplitude of the loudest possible undistorted sine wave to the root mean square (rms) noise amplitude. The 16-bit compact disc has a theoretical dynamic range of about 96 dB (or about 98 dB for sinusoidal signals, per the formula). Digital audio with 20-bit digitization is theoretically capable of 120 dB dynamic range; similarly, 24-bit digital audio calculates to 144 dB dynamic range.

== F–Z ==
FLAC
Free Lossless Audio Codec is a codec (compressor-decompressor) which allows digital audio to be losslessly compressed such that file size is reduced without any information being lost.
LPCM
Linear PCM is Pulse-code modulation (PCM) with linear quantization.
MKV
Matroska Multimedia Container is an open standard free container format, a file format that can hold an unlimited number of video, audio, picture, or subtitle tracks in one file.
MLP
Meridian Lossless Packing, also known as Packed PCM (PPCM), is a proprietary lossless compression technique for compressing PCM audio data developed by Meridian Audio, Ltd. MLP is the standard lossless compression method for DVD-Audio content (often advertised with the Advanced Resolution logo) and typically provides about 1.5:1 compression on most music material. All DVD-Audio players are equipped with MLP decoding, while its use on the discs themselves is at their producers' discretion. To store 5.1 tracks in 88.2 kHz / 20-bit, 88.2 kHz / 24-bit, 96 kHz / 20-bit or 96 kHz / 24-bit on a DVD disc, the use of MLP compression is mandatory.
MP3
MPEG-1 or MPEG-2 Audio Layer III is a patented encoding format for digital audio which uses a form of lossy data compression.
PCM
Pulse-code modulation is a method used to digitally represent sampled analog signals. It is the standard method of storing audio in computers and various Blu-ray, DVD and Compact Disc formats. PCM supports bit rates up to 1,534 kbit/s, sampling rates up to 48.0 kHz, and bit depths up to 24 bits.
Sampling rate
Sampling rate or sampling frequency is the number of samples per unit of time (usually seconds) taken from a continuous signal to make a discrete signal. Common examples of sampling rates include CD quality audio, which is recorded at 44.1 kHz, SACD which is recorded at 2.8224 MHz and DVD-Audio, which can support 96 kHz and higher.
SACD
Super Audio CD is a format capable of delivering a dynamic range of 120 dB from 20 to 20 kHz and an extended frequency response up to 100 kHz, although most currently available players list an upper limit of 80–90 kHz and 20 kHz is the upper limit of human hearing.
WAV
Waveform Audio File Format is a Microsoft and IBM audio file format standard for storing an audio bitstream on PCs.

== See also ==
- Audio codec
- Audio compression (data)
- Audio file format
- Digital audio
