= Super Bit Mapping =

Noise shaping process for audio

Super Bit Mapping (SBM) logo.

Super Bit Mapping (SBM) is a noise shaping process, developed by Sony for CD mastering.

Sony claims that the Super Bit Mapping process converts a 20-bit signal from master recording into a 16-bit signal nearly without sound quality loss, using noise shaping to improve signal-to-noise ratio over the frequency bands most acutely perceived by human hearing.

Audible quantization error is reduced by noise shaping the error according to an equal-loudness contour.

This processing takes place in dedicated hardware inside the recording device. A similar process is used in Sony's DSD to PCM conversion and is called SBM Direct.

== See also ==
- Extended Resolution Compact Disc (XRCD)
- High Definition Compatible Digital (HDCD)
