= Bitstream (disambiguation) =

A bitstream is a series of bits in a computing or telecommunications system.

Bitstream may also refer to:

- Bitstream Inc., a type foundry
- Bitstream (DAC), a 1-bit digital-to-analogue converter
