= High Definition Compatible Digital =

Proprietary backward-compatible CD audio format

- Media type: Optical disc
- Capacity: Typically up to 700 MB
- Read mechanism: 780 nm wavelength semiconductor laser
- Developed by: Pacific Microsonics Inc./Microsoft
- Usage: Audio storage
- Extended from: Red Book; Compact disc
- Released: 1995; 31 years ago

High Definition Compatible Digital (HDCD) is a proprietary audio encode-decode process that claims to provide increased dynamic range over that of standard Compact Disc Digital Audio, while retaining backward compatibility with existing compact disc players.

Originally developed by Pacific Microsonics, the first HDCD-enabled CD was released in 1995. In 2000, the technology was purchased by Microsoft, and the following year, there were over 5,000 HDCD titles available. Microsoft's HDCD official website was discontinued in 2005; by 2008, the number of available titles had declined to around 4,000.

A number of CD and DVD players include HDCD decoding, and versions 9 and above of Microsoft's Windows Media Player on personal computers are capable of decoding HDCD.

HDCD has been used by multiple artists, such as Neil Young, the Beach Boys and the Grateful Dead.

== Technical overview ==
HDCD encodes the equivalent of 20 bits worth of data in a 16-bit digital audio signal by using custom dithering, audio filters, and some reversible amplitude and gain encoding:

- Peak Extend, which is a reversible soft limiter;
- Low Level Range Extend, which is a reversible gain on low-level signals.

There is thus a benefit at the expense of a very minor increase in noise.

The claim that the encoding process is compatible with ordinary CD players (without audible distortion) is disputed: not being able to decode the peak soft limiting, a normal CD player will output distorted peaks.

== History ==
HDCD technology was developed between 1986 and 1991 by "Prof." Keith O. Johnson and Michael "Pflash" Pflaumer of Pacific Microsonics Inc. It was made publicly available as HDCD-enabled audio CDs (often identifiable by the HDCD logo printed on the back cover) in 1995.

Between 1996 and 1999 Pacific Microsonics VP of OEM Sales, Steve Fields, made over 20 trips to Japan, visiting Sanyo, Burr-Brown Japan and major audio companies, with the intent of licensing the HDCD technology. In 1998, Burr-Brown (now part of Texas Instruments) and Sanyo Electronics of Japan introduced low-cost digital-to-analog converters with HDCD decoding included, allowing HDCD to be used in CD and DVD players in the $100 range. HDCD algorithms were included in DVD chips from many IC makers including Motorola and C-Cube, allowing HDCD to be offered by mass-market DVD player makers such as Panasonic and Toshiba.

In 2000, Pacific Microsonics folded and Microsoft acquired the company and all of its intellectual property. Microsoft discontinued the official HDCD website in 2005.

In January 2007, there were roughly the same number of titles available on SACD as on HDCD-encoded CDs.

== Hardware players ==
A number of manufacturers offer players with HDCD capability. Some Panasonic DVD players and the Oppo line of players all feature HDCD decoding. Several Yamaha Blu-ray players as well as Emotiva CD players decode HDCD.

== Software players ==
=== Windows Media Player ===
Since version 9 of Microsoft's Windows Media Player (WMP), HDCD enabled CDs can be played on personal computers fitted with a 24-bit sound card.

With some HDCD discs and some DVD players using WMP, the first track may not be recognized as HDCD, but all subsequent tracks are. This is because HDCD has a control signal, and if the signal is not detected by WMP at the beginning of the song, the HDCD decoder is not activated.

=== Other software ===
In 2007, a member of the Doom9 forum authored a Windows CLI utility, hdcd.exe, to extract and decode the HDCD data in 16-bit WAV files ripped from HDCD discs. This utility writes 24-bit WAV output files with four bits of padding per sample. The author of the utility decided not to make the source code publicly available as the HDCD technology is patented.

Illustrate's dBpoweramp Music Converter, a Windows GUI program, has an HDCD DSP effect that acts as a front-end to the utility listed above.

A plugin is available for foobar2000 that will decode HDCD data in any 16-bit PCM passed through it, resulting in a 20-bit PCM stream.

FFmpeg's libavfilter includes an HDCD filter as of FFmpeg 3.1 (June 2016) that will convert 16-bit PCM with HDCD data to 20-bit PCM.

An open-source HDCD decoder library exists as libhdcd.

== See also ==
- DualDisc
- DVD-Audio
- Extended Resolution Compact Disc (XRCD)
- Super Audio CD (SACD)
- Super Bit Mapping (SBM)
