= Mobile Fidelity Sound Lab =

American record label

- Founded: 1977
- Founder: Brad Miller
- Genre: Various
- Country of origin: U.S.
- Location: Bryn Mawr Avenue, Chicago, Illinois, U.S.
- Official website: mofi.com

Mobile Fidelity Sound Lab (MFSL or MoFi) is a record label that specializes in the production of audiophile issues. Globally recognized for sourcing nearly all its releases from the original tapes, for its distinctive strip at the top of its album covers, and for its collectibility, the company reissues seminal albums on numbered-edition vinyl LP records and hybrid Super Audio CDs. It has also released music on other formats. The label's catalog encompasses more than 600 albums, including landmark records by Miles Davis; Allman Brothers Band; Joni Mitchell; Frank Sinatra; Fleetwood Mac; Bob Dylan; Ray Charles; The Beatles; Rolling Stones; Elvis Presley; Dire Straits; Santana; Janis Joplin; Grateful Dead; Carole King; Bruce Springsteen; The Band; Bob Marley; Guns N’ Roses; Run-D.M.C.; Johnny Cash; Simon and Garfunkel; Eric Clapton; The Cars; Elvis Costello; Paul Simon; Whitney Houston; Billy Joel; Bill Withers; James Taylor; Pixies; Lou Reed; Stevie Ray Vaughan; Muddy Waters; and Weezer.

== History ==
Recording engineer Brad Miller (1939–1998) released the first recordings on the Mobile Fidelity label in March 1958, a recording of a Southern Pacific steam locomotive. Later LPs included other steam trains, environmental sounds, and orchestral music, and a few pop and orchestral recordings. In 1977, Mobile Fidelity Sound Lab was founded and began releasing its signature Original Master Recording LPs using a half-speed mastering process.

In November 1999, Mobile Fidelity Sound Lab shut down after the bankruptcy of M. S. Distributing. In 2001, MFSL assets were acquired by Jim Davis of Music Direct.

== Products ==
=== LPs ===
Original Master Recordings logo

In 1977, Mobile Fidelity began to produce a line of records known as Original Master Recording vinyl LPs. These albums were previously released by other companies, licensed by Mobile Fidelity, and remastered using half-speed mastering from the original analog master tapes, without compression, and with minimal equalization.

In 2016, Mobile Fidelity Sound Lab launched a new vinyl series called UltraDisc One-Step, releasing titles including Santana's Abraxas and Bill Evans's Sunday at the Village Vanguard. The UltraDisc One-Step process reduces the number of steps between cutting the master lacquer and the final pressing. With One-Step, a single stamper containing a negative image of the record grooves is produced directly from the positive grooves cut into the master lacquer. As a result of stampers wearing out after pressing around 1,000 records, more lacquers have to be cut to create additional stampers. The traditional three step process, on the other hand, allows multiple stampers from a single "mother" intermediate.

=== Cassettes, CDs, and SACDs ===
During the mid-1980s, Mobile Fidelity began to sell CDs and cassettes. In the 2000s, it began to sell SACDs.

=== MoFi Electronics ===
In 2016, a related audio electronics company was launched as MoFi Electronics. MoFi Electronics offices and turntable manufacturing are based in Ann Arbor, Michigan. MoFi Electronics have released turntables, phono cartridges, speakers, and phono stages.

MoFi Electronics phono cartridges
Name	Stylus	Cantilever	Output voltage	MSRP (USD)	Released
StudioTracker MM	Eliptical	Aluminium	3.5 mV	$179	Jun 2017
UltraTracker MM	Nude Eliptical	Aluminium	3.5 mV	$349	Jun 2017
MasterTracker MM	Micro Linear	Aluminium	3.0 mV	$549	Jun 2017
StudioSilver MC	Nude Micro Linear	Boron	0.35 mV	$999	
UltraGold MC	Shibata	Boron	0.4 mV	$1,495	Nov 2021

== Audio sourcing controversy ==
On July 14, 2022, Michael Esposito, a record store owner and YouTuber, released a video on his YouTube channel "The 'In' Groove" stating that "pretty reliable sources" informed him that MFSL had been using Direct Stream Digital files created from the original analogue master tapes. John Wood, the label's executive president, saw Esposito's video and then invited him to California for a tour of their business. A second video was produced with Esposito interviewing MFSL staff, where they confirmed that they were using Direct Stream Digital files when creating their vinyl masters for duplication. The staff members stated that at least 60% of all titles used this process by the end of 2011, and that the process was also being used for the label's UltraDisc One-Step releases, which were previously marketed as coming directly from the original master tapes. The revelation generated controversy over not only Mobile Fidelity's integrity but also the extent of analog audio's perceived merits over digital audio. A reason why digital masters are created is due to the analog master tapes being fragile to damage, especially on older recordings. Each time a master tape is run, it undergoes wear. Mobile Fidelity claims that it does not edit the digital transfer from the analog master tape as a DSD file would have to be converted to a high-resolution PCM file so that it could be edited.

In August 2022, Adam Stiles, a longtime customer of Mobile Fidelity Sound Lab, filed a class action fraud lawsuit against the label over the revelations.
