= EastWest Studios =

Recording studio complex in Hollywood, US

Coordinates: 34.0979°N 118.3209°W

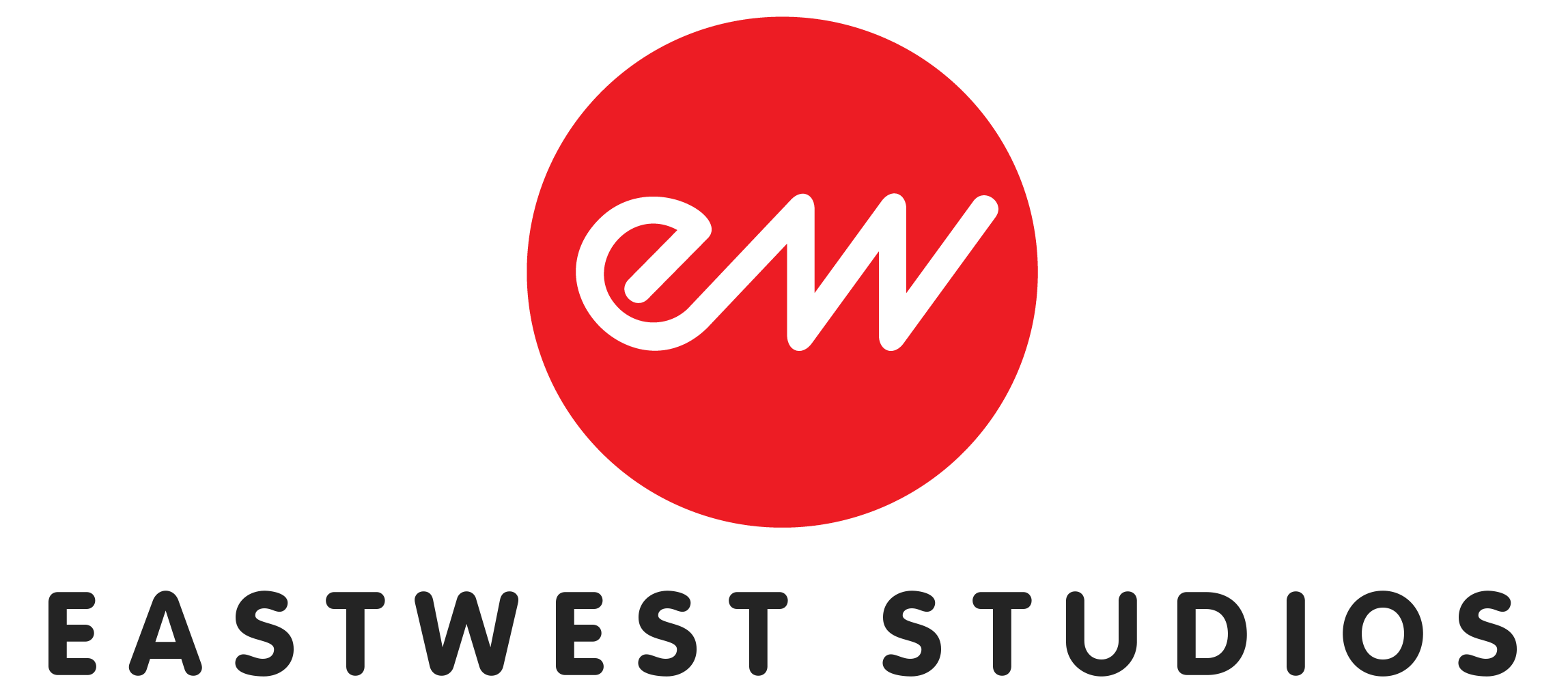

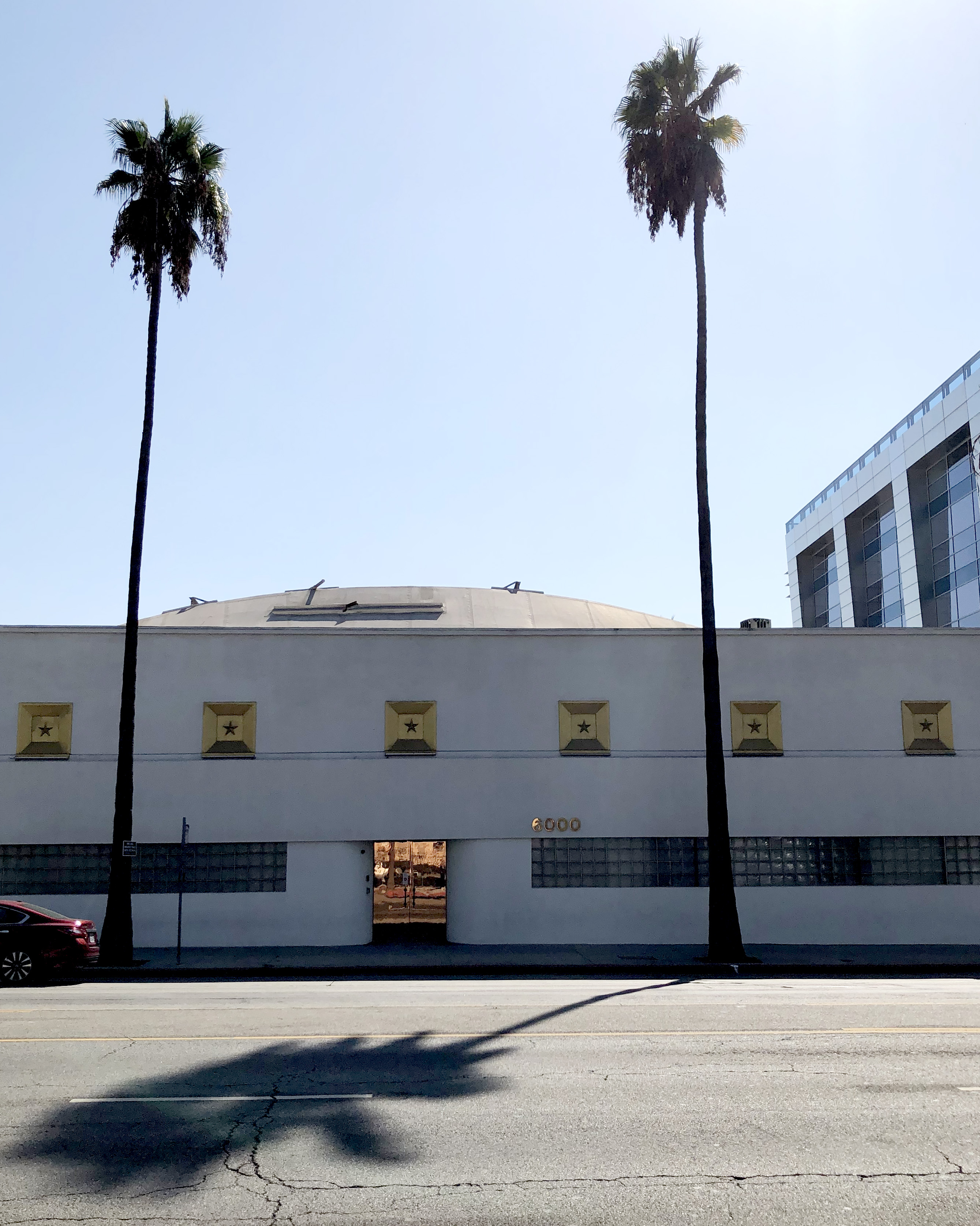
- 6000 W. Sunset Boulevard
- Industry: Music
- Predecessor: Cello Studios
- Founded: 2006; 20 years ago
- Headquarters: Hollywood, Los Angeles, California, United States
- Area served: US
- Key people: Doug Rogers
- Products: Recording studios
- Website: eastweststudios.com

EastWest Studios (formerly known as Western Studio, a component of United Western Recorders and later Ocean Way Recording) is a recording studio complex located at 6000 West Sunset Boulevard in Hollywood. Originally constructed by Bill Putnam in the 1960s, the studios are currently owned by sound developer Doug Rogers and managed by Candace Stewart.

== Background ==
EastWest Studios was first known as Western Studio, one half of the United Western Recorders studio complex located on 6000 and 6050 West Sunset Boulevard. In 1984, United Western Recorders was sold and renamed to Ocean Way Recording. In 1998, the former Western Studio half at 6000 Sunset was divided from Ocean Way Recording, sold, and renamed to Cello Studios. In 2005, Cello Studios ceased operation.

On January 17, 2006, Doug Rogers acquired ownership of 6000 Sunset. Rogers commissioned designer Philippe Starck (SLS Hotel Los Angeles, St. Martins Lane hotel, London) to refurbish and redesign the artist lounges, kitchen, and reception areas, which had previously suffered water damage. Careful to preserve the integrity of the original recording facilities, Starck and Rogers implemented a brand-new design to create "a place where artists can meet, mingle, and be inspired". The studio complex became Starck's first and only recording studio design.

In March 2009, the renovated studios, renamed EastWest Studios, opened to the public. As of June 2020, it produced over 120 Grammy nominations, more than any other studio in the world.

== Live rooms and consoles ==
EastWest Studios consists of three main studios. Studio 1 features a live room which is 58' × 42', an isolation booth measuring 20' × 23', 9' Bechstein piano, concert lighting system and one of a limited number of classic Neve 8078 consoles remaining in the world today. Studio 2's live room measures 35' × 24', with a 10' × 14' isolation booth and 8' × 6' vocal booth and a classic RCA custom order Neve console, A1006. The smallest of the rooms, Studio 3, is 31' × 15' with a Steinway piano and a classic Trident A Range console. All three rooms are fitted with flying fader automation and ATC main monitors.

== EastWest Sounds ==
EastWest Sounds was founded by recording engineer Doug Rogers in 1988 as a manufacturer of sample libraries. The company partnered with high-profile mixing engineer Bob Clearmountain to release two commercially-successful Bob Clearmountain Drums sample collections in the early 1990s.

In the early 2000s, Rogers (head of EastWest Sounds) and Nick Phoenix (co-founder of Two Steps From Hell) conceived the EastWest/Quantum Leap Symphonic Orchestra orchestral sample library. Recorded by Grammy-winning recording engineer "Prof" Keith O. Johnson in a 2200-seat concert hall starting in August 2002, the resulting multi-channel recordings were edited and programmed for another year before the library was released.

In 2006, EastWest Sounds purchased Cello Studios to curtail the cost of booking sessions at recording studios to record samples. Since then, EastWest Sounds offices have been located at the studios, and the company's virtual instruments, from the Hollywood Orchestra series, recorded at Studio 1 with some of Hollywood's film score orchestral session players and engineer Shawn Murphy, to numerous genre-specific collections, are recorded there.
