= Extended Resolution Compact Disc =

Compact disc manufacturing process

Logo

Extended Resolution Compact Disc (XRCD) is a mastering and manufacture process patented by JVC (Victor Company of Japan, Ltd) for producing Red Book compact discs. It was first introduced in 1995.

An XRCD is priced about twice as high as a regular full-priced CD. JVC attributes this to the higher cost of quality mastering and manufacturing.

== Technical overview ==
The XRCD definition refers to the mastering and manufacture process; the resulting CD and the contained data conform to the redbook standard and are encoded at 16 bits, 44.1 kHz. Hence, XRCDs are playable on any compact disc player.

JVC uses advanced dither algorithms (though without noise shaping) in their K2 technology to transfer the analog or digital source to physical disc. The company claims to have studied how inferior CD-remastering techniques degrade the master tape sound and strives to minimize this loss.

Unlike HDCD, the extra four bits cannot be recovered, as this method of mastering only aims to improve dithering to 16-bit, rather than to store extra data.

== Mastering process ==
If analog, the source material is first converted to digital via JVC's K2 20-bit or 24-bit analog-to-digital converter.

The musical information is next encoded on a magneto-optical disk for transport to JVC's Yokohama manufacturing plant, where jitter reduction is applied. The musical signal on the disk is down-converted to 16-bit through a K2 "super-coding" process. This 16-bit signal is eight-to-fourteen modulation-encoded (EFM-encoded) before going through a proprietary "Extended Pit Cut" DVD K2 laser technology to produce a glass master. JVC claims this optimizes the linear velocity of the glass master, giving precise pit lengths to eliminate time jitters, controlled by an extremely precise rubidium clock. All CDs are finally stamped directly from this glass master.

XRCD2 and XRCD24 are improved versions of the original XRCD process. XRCD2 is the first to record to a magneto-optical disk via the digital K2 regenerator, while XRCD24 upgrades the original music signal's bit depth signal from 20 to 24 bits.

== See also ==
- Dither
- High Definition Compatible Digital (HDCD)
- Super Bit Mapping (SBM)
- TPDF
