= Digital eXtreme Definition =

High-definition digital audio format

Digital eXtreme Definition (DXD) is a digital audio format that was originally developed by Digital Audio Denmark and Merging Technologies for editing high-resolution recordings recorded in Direct Stream Digital (DSD), the audio standard used on Super Audio CD (SACD). As the 1-bit DSD format used on SACD is not suitable for editing, alternative formats such as DXD or DSD-Wide must be used during the mastering stage.

In contrast with DSD-Wide or DSD Pure which offers level, EQ, and crossfade edits at the DSD sample rate (64fs, 64 times the 44.1kHz base sample rate, or 2.822 MHz), DXD is a PCM signal with 24-bit resolution (8 bits more than the 16 bits used for Red Book CD) sampled at 352.8 kHz – eight times 44.1 kHz, the sampling frequency of Red Book CD. The data rate is 8.4672 Mbit/s per channel – three times that of DSD64. DXD also utilizes the vast array of plugins also available to PCM-based digital audio workstations, such as Cubase, Logic Studio, Digital Performer, etc.

DXD was initially developed for the Merging Pyramix workstation and introduced together with their Sphynx 2, AD/DA converter in 2004. This combination meant that it was possible to record and edit directly in DXD, and that the sample only converts to DSD once before publishing to SACD. This offers a great advantage to the user as the noise created by converting DSD rises dramatically above 20 kHz, and more noise is added each time a signal is converted back to DSD during editing.

Today, DXD is also used as a music distribution format in some hi-res web stores.
