= Bit depth =

Bit depth may refer to:

- Color depth, also known as bit depth, the number of bits used to indicate the color of a single pixel
- Audio bit depth, the number of bits of information in each sample of digital audio
