= 1-bit =

1 bit is the smallest possible information size.

1-bit may refer to:

- 1-bit computing, systems that process 1 bit per work cycle
- 1-bit DAC, the oversampling digital-to-analog converter technology
- Binary image or 1-bit images, images made out of two colours
