= Merging Technologies =

Swiss manufacturer of professional audio hardware and software

Merging Technologies S.A.
- Industry: Professional audio
- Founded: 1990; 36 years ago in Puidoux, Switzerland
- Founder: Claude Cellier, Jean-Marc Porchet, Dominique Brulhart, Markus Erne
- Headquarters: Puidoux, Vaud, Switzerland
- Area served: Worldwide
- Products: Pyramix; Ovation; Virtual Audio Device (VAD); Merging Audio Device (MAD); Horus; Hapi MkII, Hapi; Anubis
- Website: www.merging.com

Merging Technologies is a Swiss manufacturer of professional audio hardware and software.

== History ==
Merging Technologies was founded in 1990 in Puidoux, Vaud, by EPFL electrical engineering graduate Claude Cellier, Jean-Marc Porchet, Dominique Brulhart and Markus Erne.

Early company goal was to quickly develop a Digital Audio Workstation building on Claude Cellier and Markus Erne previous extended audio experience and then pivot to a video editing system. However as it took 5 years to develop the 1st version of Pyramix a decision was made to postpone video editing to focus on Pyramix as v1 was far from the perfect audio tool it has now become.

In 2022, Merging Technologies was acquired by Sennheiser.

== Digital eXtreme Definition ==
DXD (Digital eXtreme Definition) is a digital audio format that originally was developed by Philips and Merging Technologies for editing high-resolution recordings recorded in DSD, the audio standard used on Super Audio CD (SACD).

== Products ==
=== Hardware ===
Hardware manufactured by Merging includes the following:

- Anubis (Networked AD/DA audio interface)
- Horus (Networked AD/DA audio interface)
- Hapi (Networked AD/DA audio interface)
- Hapi MkII (Networked AD/DA audio interface)
- MERGING+NADAC (Audiophile DAC, now discontinued)
- Mykerinos (DSP card, now discontinued)
- DUA & DUAII (AD/DA converters, now discontinued)
- Sphynx & Sphynx 2 (AD/DA converters, now discontinued)

=== Software ===
Merging develops software products which include the following:

- Pyramix: a digital audio workstation (DAW)
- Ovation: a media server and sequencer
- ANEMAN: an Audio Network Manager.
- Merging Audio Device (also referred to as MAD): multi-ASIO AoIP driver for Windows OS.
- Virtual Audio Device (also referred to as VAD): Core Audio AoIP driver plugin for macOS.
- VCube: a video player and recorder, now discontinued

== See also ==
- DXD
- AES67 § Adoption
- Direct Stream Digital#DSD technique
