= Keith O. Johnson =

American recording engineer and audio designer

- Other names: "Prof" Keith O. Johnson, "The Professor"
- Occupations: Recording engineer, audio designer
- Known for: Reference Recordings; co-development of HDCD
- Awards: Grammy Award for Best Surround Sound Album (2011)

Keith O. Johnson, known in the audio press as "Professor" Johnson, is an American recording engineer and audio equipment designer. A founding partner of the classical label Reference Recordings, he built much of the equipment used for its sessions and engineered its releases. With Michael "Pflash" Pflaumer he developed High Definition Compatible Digital (HDCD), a coding system for the compact disc commercialized by Pacific Microsonics and acquired by Microsoft in 2000. He has won one Grammy Award from thirteen nominations.

== Early life and education ==
Johnson began recording in the early 1950s on Pentron machines, and at fourteen assembled a vacuum-tube tape recorder from parts of a Sears Roebuck Silvertone machine fitted with heads of his own manufacture. He studied at Stanford University, concentrating on instrumentation and transistor circuitry, and during the 1960s built a solid-state three-channel tape recorder later used on more than a hundred recordings. As a summer student at Ampex he investigated photolithography as a means of producing thin magnetic heads able to operate at high frequencies.

== Career ==
=== Equipment and tape technology ===
Johnson helped form Gauss Electrophysics, which built high-speed tape duplicators using heads of his design. He contributed to MCA DiscoVision and holds a patent covering the embossing of plastic discs and their readback by a servo-guided pickup. He engineered orchestral programs for Armed Forces Radio and, in the 1970s, worked with the band Ambrosia and producer Alan Parsons.

=== Reference Recordings ===
Reference Recordings was founded in 1976 by Johnson with Tam Henderson and Marcia Martin. Johnson met Henderson while recording a small classical ensemble at a party. The label's early releases included Professor Johnson's Astounding Sound Show, recordings of Tafelmusik and Respighi's Church Windows. He designed and built the label's recording chain himself. His microphones used Schoeps capsules with lighter diaphragms and modified interface circuitry, his mixer was a passive device with no active circuitry, and his tape machine was built from the ground up, including its heads and transport. He has engineered the label's releases since its founding.

=== HDCD and Pacific Microsonics ===
In the mid-1980s Michael Ritter introduced Johnson to the engineer Michael "Pflash" Pflaumer, and the three set out to improve the sound of the compact disc. The resulting system, HDCD, was designed as a conjugate process in which an encoding stage and a complementary decoding stage each contribute to the improvement; Johnson and Pflaumer developed it by combining measurement with extensive listening tests. Two patents covering the encode and decode system were assigned to Pacific Microsonics, the Berkeley, California company that Johnson co-founded with Pflaumer to develop and market HDCD. By 1999 the technology had been licensed to more than ninety hardware manufacturers, over two thousand HDCD titles had been issued and about 125 million such discs had been sold. Microsoft acquired the company and its intellectual property in 2000 and continued to use HDCD in its personal computer products.

He also conceived the Colortek optical CCD scanner, which removes noise from damaged motion picture soundtracks, and with Parsons developed the Projectron, an early polyphonic sampling instrument.

== Awards ==
Johnson received the Audio Engineering Society's Fellowship award in 1967.

He won the Grammy Award for Best Surround Sound Album at the 53rd Annual Grammy Awards in 2011, shared with producer David Frost, for Britten's Orchestra, a multichannel SACD recorded with the Kansas City Symphony under Michael Stern. It was his first win after seven nominations.

Grammy Awards
Year	Ceremony	Category	Work	Result
1993	35th	Best Engineered Recording, Classical	Arnold: A Sussex Overture; Beckus the Dandipratt; The Smoke; The Fair Field	Nominated
1997	39th	Best Classical Engineered Recording	Stravinsky: The Song of the Nightingale; The Firebird Suite	Nominated
1999	41st	Best Engineered Album, Classical	Bruckner: Symphony No. 9	Nominated
2001	43rd	Best Engineered Album, Classical	Bolero!	Nominated
2002	44th	Best Engineered Album, Classical	Respighi: Belkis, Queen of Sheba – Suite; Dance of the Gnomes; The Pines of Rome	Nominated
2003	45th	Best Engineered Album, Classical	Rachmaninoff: Symphonic Dances; Vocalise	Nominated
2008	50th	Best Engineered Album, Classical	Garden of Dreams	Nominated
2011	53rd	Best Surround Sound Album	Britten's Orchestra	Won
2016	58th	Best Engineered Album, Classical	Saint-Saëns: Symphony No. 3, "Organ"	Nominated
2018	60th	Best Engineered Album, Classical	Schoenberg, Adam: American Symphony; Finding Rothko; Picture Studies	Nominated
2019	61st	Best Engineered Album, Classical	John Williams at the Movies	Nominated
2020	62nd	Best Engineered Album, Classical	Rachmaninoff	Nominated
2020	62nd	Best Immersive Audio Album	The Orchestral Organ	Nominated
