= 1-bit DAC =

Type of converter for electronics

A 1-bit DAC (sometimes called Bitstream converter by Philips) is a consumer electronics marketing term describing an oversampling digital-to-analog converter (DAC) that uses a digital noise shaping delta-sigma modulator operating at many multiples of the sampling frequency that outputs to an actual 1-bit DAC (which could be fully differential to minimize crosstalk). The combination can have high signal-to-noise and hence an equivalent effective number of bits as a DAC with a larger number of bits (usually 16–20).

The advantages of this type of converter are high linearity combined with low cost, as most of the processing takes place in the digital domain, which helps relax the requirements for the subsequent analog low-pass filter (for anti-aliasing image frequencies and suppressing high-frequency noise-shaping noise). For these reasons, this design is very popular in digital consumer electronics (CD/DVD players, set-top boxes and the like).

While single-bit delta-sigma DACs have an advantage of a much simpler internal DAC, multi-bit delta-sigma DACs have the advantages of a simpler digital noise-shaping loop, less dithering, a much simpler analog smoothing filter, and less sensitivity to clock jitter, so generally the advantages of multi-bit truncation outweigh single-bit truncation.

== Linearity ==
Multi-bit DACs may have severe linearity error, mainly due to mismatch in components, with significant error when the sign bit changes (called "zero-crossing distortion"). But a 1-bit DAC only has a gain error, since its transfer function has only full-scale positive and negative reference points, with the intermediate points determined by time averaging. While multi-bit DACs try to seek resolution in amplitude, 1-bit DACs instead compensate by taking advantage of digital filtering combined with the high accuracy in time provided by quartz crystals.

== Examples ==
For example, the 1991 Philips SAA7322/3 first oversamples 44.1 kHz 16-bit input audio by 4x with a low-pass FIR filter to produce a 176.4 kHz intermediate signal, which again oversamples 32x more while adding a 352 kHz digital dither signal, and then oversamples 2x more to produce a 11.2896 MHz 1-bit output (a total of 256x oversampling).

Another 1991 Philips example, the SAA7350, oversamples a total of 384x, which for its maximum input frequency of 53 kHz 20-bit audio results in a 20.35 MHz 1-bit output.

== "Bitstream" ==
Philips also used the "Bitstream converter" trademark for the TDA1305 which is also an oversampling converter (by 384x), but which ultimately outputs through a 5-bit DAC. So it is not clear that "bitstream" by Philips necessarily refers to a 1-bit output, but could include other DACs that utilize large oversampling into low-bit DACs.

The word "bitstream" is also a general computing word for a sequence of bits, used in many contexts other than 1-bit DACs.

== See also ==
- Digital-to-analog converter § Types
- Direct Stream Digital
