= Signal-to-quantization-noise ratio =

Measure for analyzing digitizing schemes

Signal-to-quantization-noise ratio (SQNR or SN_{q}R) is widely used quality measure in analysing digitizing schemes such as pulse-code modulation (PCM). The SQNR reflects the relationship between the maximum nominal signal strength and the quantization error (also known as quantization noise) introduced in the analog-to-digital conversion.

As SQNR applies to quantized signals, the formulae for SQNR refer to discrete-time digital signals. Instead of the value- and time-continuous message signal $m(t)$, the digitized signal $x(n)$ will be used. For $N$ quantization steps, each sample, $x$ requires $\nu=\log_2 N$ bits. The probability distribution function (PDF) represents the distribution of values in $x$ and can be denoted as $f(x)$. The maximum magnitude value of any $x$ is denoted by $x_{max}$.

As SQNR, like SNR, is a ratio of signal power to some noise power, it can be calculated as:

$$\mathrm{SQNR} = \frac{P_{signal}}{P_{noise}} = \frac{E[x^2]}{E[\tilde{x}^2]}$$

The signal power is:

$$\overline{x^2} = E[x^2] = P_{x^\nu}=\int_{}^{}x^2f(x)dx$$

The quantization noise power can be expressed as:

$$E[\tilde{x}^2] = \frac{x_{max}^2}{3\times4^\nu}$$

Giving:

$$\mathrm{SQNR} = \frac{3 \times 4^\nu\times \overline{x^2}}{x_{max}^2}$$

When the SQNR is desired in terms of decibels (dB), a useful approximation to SQNR is:

$$\mathrm{SQNR}|_{dB}=P_{x^\nu}+6.02\nu+4.77$$

where $\nu$ is the number of bits in a quantized sample, and $P_{x^\nu}$ is the signal power calculated above. Note that for each bit added to a sample, the SQNR goes up by approximately 6 dB ($20\times log_{10}(2)$).
