= Quantization (signal processing) =

Process of mapping a continuous set to a countable set

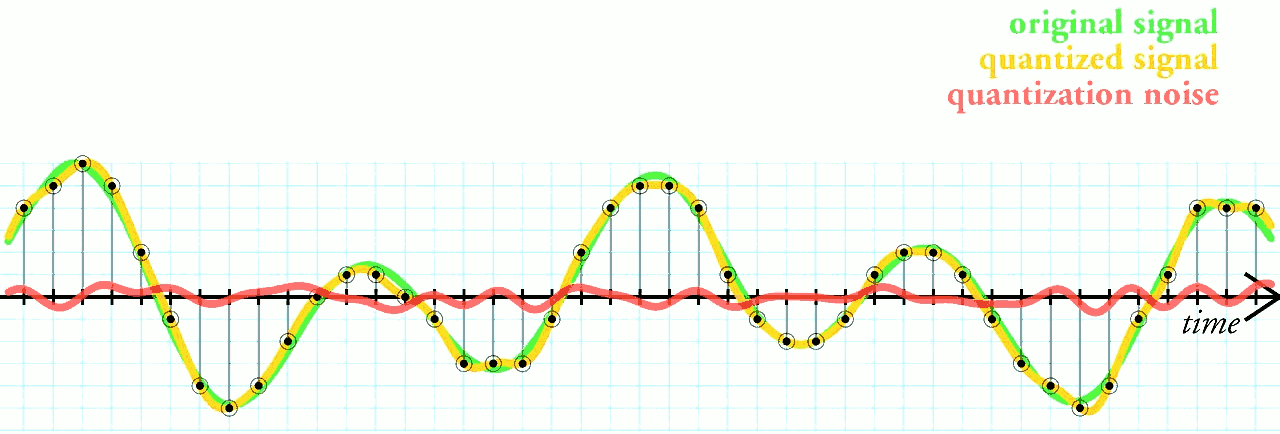
The simplest way to quantize a signal is to choose the digital amplitude value closest to the original analog amplitude. This example shows the original analog signal (green), the quantized signal (black dots), the signal reconstructed from the quantized signal (yellow) and the difference between the original signal and the reconstructed signal (red). The difference between the original signal and the reconstructed signal is the quantization error and, in this simple quantization scheme, is a deterministic function of the input signal.

In mathematics and digital signal processing, quantization is the process of mapping input values from a large set (often a continuous set) to output values in a (countable) smaller set, often with a finite number of elements. Rounding and truncation are typical examples of quantization processes. Quantization is involved to some degree in nearly all digital signal processing, as the process of representing a signal in digital form ordinarily involves rounding. Quantization also forms the core of essentially all lossy compression algorithms.

The difference between an input value and its quantized value (such as round-off error) is referred to as quantization error, noise or distortion. A device or algorithmic function that performs quantization is called a quantizer. An analog-to-digital converter is an example of a quantizer.

== Example ==
For example, rounding a real number $x$ to the nearest integer value forms a very basic type of quantizer – a uniform one. A typical (mid-tread) uniform quantizer with a quantization step size equal to some value $\Delta$ can be expressed as

$$Q(x) = \Delta \cdot  \left\lfloor \frac{x}{\Delta} + \frac{1}{2} \right\rfloor$$,

where the notation $\lfloor \ \rfloor$ denotes the floor function.

Alternatively, the same quantizer may be expressed in terms of the ceiling function, as

$$Q(x) = \Delta \cdot  \left\lceil \frac{x}{\Delta} - \frac{1}{2} \right\rceil$$.

(The notation $\lceil \ \rceil$ denotes the ceiling function).

The essential property of a quantizer is having a countable set of possible output values smaller than the set of possible input values. The members of the set of output values may have integer, rational, or real values. For simple rounding to the nearest integer, the step size $\Delta$ is equal to 1. With $\Delta = 1$ or with $\Delta$ equal to any other integer value, this quantizer has real-valued inputs and integer-valued outputs.

When the quantization step size (Δ) is small relative to the variation in the signal being quantized, it is relatively simple to show that the mean squared error produced by such a rounding operation will be approximately $\Delta^2/ 12$. Mean squared error is also called the quantization noise power. Adding one bit to the quantizer halves the value of Δ, which reduces the noise power by the factor 1/4. In terms of decibels, the noise power change is $\scriptstyle 10\cdot \log_{10}(1/4)\ \approx\ -6\ \mathrm{dB}.$

Because the set of possible output values of a quantizer is countable, any quantizer can be decomposed into two distinct stages, which can be referred to as the classification stage (or forward quantization stage) and the reconstruction stage (or inverse quantization stage), where the classification stage maps the input value to an integer quantization index $k$ and the reconstruction stage maps the index $k$ to the reconstruction value $y_k$ that is the output approximation of the input value. For the example uniform quantizer described above, the forward quantization stage can be expressed as

$$k = \left\lfloor \frac{x}{\Delta} + \frac{1}{2}\right\rfloor$$,

and the reconstruction stage for this example quantizer is simply

$$y_k = k \cdot \Delta$$.

This decomposition is useful for the design and analysis of quantization behavior, and it illustrates how the quantized data can be communicated over a communication channel – a source encoder can perform the forward quantization stage and send the index information through a communication channel, and a decoder can perform the reconstruction stage to produce the output approximation of the original input data. In general, the forward quantization stage may use any function that maps the input data to the integer space of the quantization index data, and the inverse quantization stage can conceptually (or literally) be a table look-up operation to map each quantization index to a corresponding reconstruction value. This two-stage decomposition applies equally well to vector as well as scalar quantizers.

== Mathematical properties ==
Because quantization is a many-to-few mapping, it is an inherently non-linear and irreversible process (i.e., because the same output value is shared by multiple input values, it is impossible, in general, to recover the exact input value when given only the output value).

The set of possible input values may be infinitely large, and may possibly be continuous and therefore uncountable (such as the set of all real numbers, or all real numbers within some limited range). The set of possible output values may be finite or countably infinite. The input and output sets involved in quantization can be defined in a rather general way. For example, vector quantization is the application of quantization to multi-dimensional (vector-valued) input data.

== Types ==
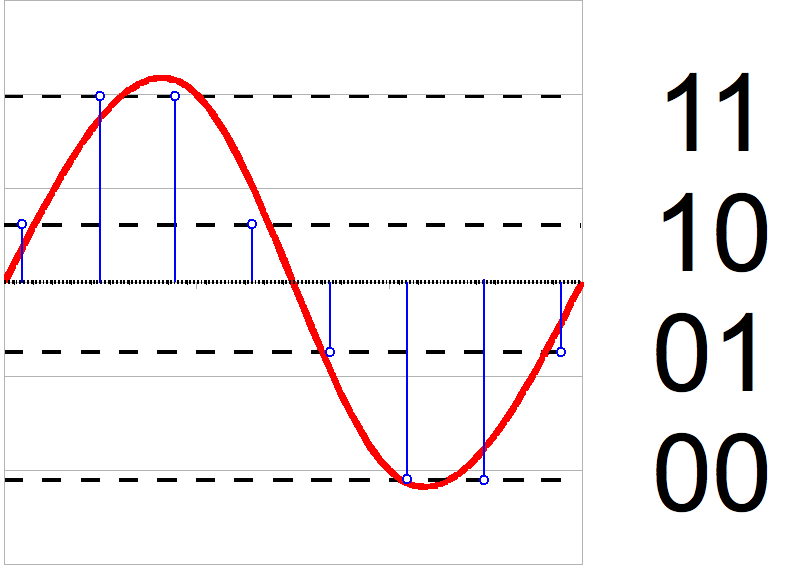
2-bit resolution with four levels of quantization compared to analog

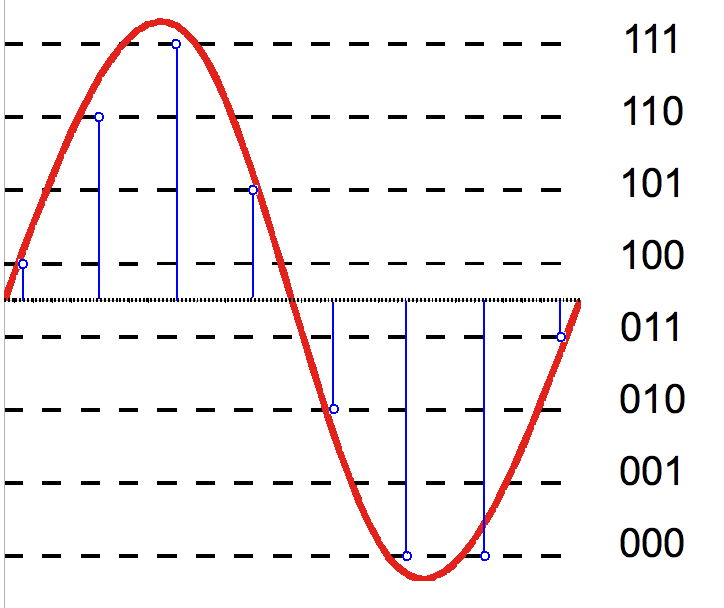
3-bit resolution with eight levels

=== Analog-to-digital converter ===
An analog-to-digital converter (ADC) can be modeled as two processes: sampling and quantization. Sampling converts a time-varying voltage signal into a discrete-time signal, a sequence of real numbers. Quantization replaces each real number with an approximation from a finite set of discrete values. Most commonly, these discrete values are represented as fixed-point words. Though any number of quantization levels is possible, common word lengths are 8-bit (256 levels), 16-bit (65,536 levels) and 24-bit (16.8 million levels). Quantizing a sequence of numbers produces a sequence of quantization errors, which is sometimes modeled as an additive random signal called quantization noise because of its stochastic behavior. The more levels a quantizer uses, the lower is its quantization noise power.

=== Rate–distortion optimization ===
Rate–distortion optimized quantization is encountered in source coding for lossy data compression algorithms, where the purpose is to manage distortion within the limits of the bit rate supported by a communication channel or storage medium. The analysis of quantization in this context involves studying the amount of data (typically measured in digits or bits or bit rate) that is used to represent the output of the quantizer and studying the loss of precision that is introduced by the quantization process (which is referred to as the distortion).

=== Mid-riser and mid-tread uniform quantizers ===
Most uniform quantizers for signed input data can be classified as being of one of two types: mid-riser and mid-tread. The terminology is based on what happens in the region around the value 0, and uses the analogy of viewing the input-output function of the quantizer as a stairway. Mid-tread quantizers have a zero-valued reconstruction level (corresponding to a tread of a stairway), while mid-riser quantizers have a zero-valued classification threshold (corresponding to a riser of a stairway).

Mid-tread quantization involves rounding. The formulas for mid-tread uniform quantization are provided in the previous section.

$$Q(x) = \Delta \cdot  \left\lfloor \frac{x}{\Delta} + \frac{1}{2} \right\rfloor$$,

Mid-riser quantization involves truncation. The input-output formula for a mid-riser uniform quantizer is given by:

$$Q(x) = \Delta\cdot\left(\left\lfloor \frac{x}{\Delta}\right\rfloor + \frac1{2}\right)$$,

where the classification rule is given by

$$k = \left\lfloor \frac{x}{\Delta} \right\rfloor$$

and the reconstruction rule is

$$y_k = \Delta\cdot\left(k+\tfrac1{2}\right)$$.

Note that mid-riser uniform quantizers do not have a zero output value – their minimum output magnitude is half the step size. In contrast, mid-tread quantizers do have a zero output level. For some applications, having a zero output signal representation may be a necessity.

In general, a mid-riser or mid-tread quantizer may not actually be a uniform quantizer – i.e., the size of the quantizer's classification intervals may not all be the same, or the spacing between its possible output values may not all be the same. The distinguishing characteristic of a mid-riser quantizer is that it has a classification threshold value that is exactly zero, and the distinguishing characteristic of a mid-tread quantizer is that is it has a reconstruction value that is exactly zero.

=== Dead-zone quantizers ===
A dead-zone quantizer is a type of mid-tread quantizer with symmetric behavior around 0. The region around the zero output value of such a quantizer is referred to as the dead zone or deadband. The dead zone can sometimes serve the same purpose as a noise gate or squelch function. Especially for compression applications, the dead-zone may be given a different width than that for the other steps. For an otherwise-uniform quantizer, the dead-zone width can be set to any value $w$ by using the forward quantization rule

$$k = \sgn(x) \cdot \max\left(0, \left\lfloor \frac{\left| x \right|-w/2}{\Delta}+1\right\rfloor\right)$$,

where the function $\sgn$( ) is the sign function (also known as the signum function). The general reconstruction rule for such a dead-zone quantizer is given by

$$y_k = \sgn(k) \cdot\left(\frac{w}{2}+\Delta\cdot (|k|-1+r_k)\right)$$,

where $r_k$ is a reconstruction offset value in the range of 0 to 1 as a fraction of the step size. Ordinarily, $0 \le r_k \le \tfrac1{2}$ when quantizing input data with a typical probability density function (PDF) that is symmetric around zero and reaches its peak value at zero (such as a Gaussian, Laplacian, or generalized Gaussian PDF). Although $r_k$ may depend on $k$ in general and can be chosen to fulfill the optimality condition described below, it is often simply set to a constant, such as $\tfrac1{2}$. (Note that in this definition, $y_0 = 0$ due to the definition of the $\sgn$( ) function, so $r_0$ has no effect.)

A very commonly used special case (e.g., the scheme typically used in financial accounting and elementary mathematics) is to set $w=\Delta$ and $r_k=\tfrac1{2}$ for all $k$. In this case, the dead-zone quantizer is also a uniform quantizer, since the central dead-zone of this quantizer has the same width as all of its other steps, and all of its reconstruction values are equally spaced as well.

== Noise and error characteristics ==
=== Additive noise model ===
A common assumption for the analysis of quantization error is that it affects a signal processing system in a similar manner to that of additive white noise – having negligible correlation with the signal and an approximately flat power spectral density. The additive noise model is commonly used for the analysis of quantization error effects in digital filtering systems, and it can be very useful in such analysis. It has been shown to be a valid model in cases of high-resolution quantization (small $\Delta$ relative to the signal strength) with smooth PDFs.

Additive noise behavior is not always a valid assumption. Quantization error (for quantizers defined as described here) is deterministically related to the signal and not entirely independent of it. Thus, periodic signals can create periodic quantization noise. And in some cases, it can even cause limit cycles to appear in digital signal processing systems. One way to ensure effective independence of the quantization error from the source signal is to perform dithered quantization (sometimes with noise shaping), which involves adding random (or pseudo-random) noise to the signal prior to quantization.

=== Quantization error models ===
In the typical case, the original signal is much larger than one least significant bit (LSB). When this is the case, the quantization error is not significantly correlated with the signal and has an approximately uniform distribution. When rounding is used to quantize, the quantization error has a mean of zero and the root mean square (RMS) value is the standard deviation of this distribution, given by $\scriptstyle {\frac{1}{\sqrt{12}}}\mathrm{LSB}\ \approx\ 0.289\,\mathrm{LSB}$. When truncation is used, the error has a non-zero mean of $\scriptstyle {\frac{1}{2}}\mathrm{LSB}$ and the RMS value is $\scriptstyle {\frac{1}{\sqrt{3}}}\mathrm{LSB}$. Although rounding yields less RMS error than truncation, the difference is only due to the static (DC) term of $\scriptstyle {\frac{1}{2}}\mathrm{LSB}$. The RMS values of the AC error are exactly the same in both cases, so there is no special advantage of rounding over truncation in situations where the DC term of the error can be ignored (such as in AC-coupled systems). In either case, the standard deviation, as a percentage of the full signal range, changes by a factor of 2 for each 1-bit change in the number of quantization bits. The potential signal-to-quantization-noise power ratio therefore changes by 4, or $\scriptstyle 10\cdot \log_{10}(4)$, approximately 6 dB per bit.

At lower amplitudes, the quantization error becomes dependent on the input signal, resulting in distortion. This distortion is created after the anti-aliasing filter, and if these distortions are above 1/2 the sample rate, they will alias back into the band of interest. In order to make the quantization error independent of the input signal, the signal is dithered by adding noise to the signal. This slightly reduces signal-to-noise ratio, but can completely eliminate the distortion.

=== Quantization noise model ===
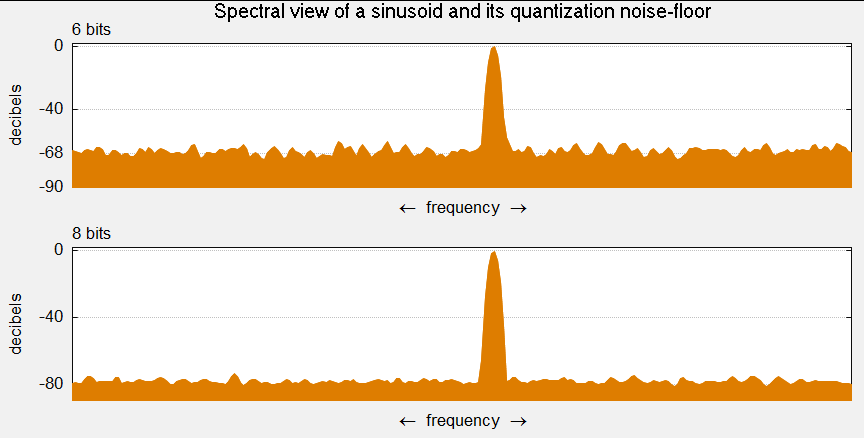
Comparison of quantizing a sinusoid to 64 levels (6 bits) and 256 levels (8 bits). The additive noise created by 6-bit quantization is 12 dB greater than the noise created by 8-bit quantization. When the spectral distribution is flat, as in this example, the 12 dB difference manifests as a measurable difference in the noise floors.

Quantization noise is a model of quantization error introduced by quantization in the ADC. It is a rounding error between the analog input voltage to the ADC and the output digitized value. The noise is non-linear and signal-dependent. It can be modeled in several different ways.

In an ideal ADC, where the quantization error is uniformly distributed between −1/2 LSB and +1/2 LSB, and the signal has a uniform distribution covering all quantization levels, the Signal-to-quantization-noise ratio (SQNR) can be calculated from

$$\mathrm{SQNR} = 20 \log_{10}(2^Q) \approx 6.02 \cdot Q\ \mathrm{dB} \,\!$$

where Q is the number of quantization bits.

The most common test signals that fulfill this are full amplitude triangle waves and sawtooth waves.

For example, a 16-bit ADC has a maximum signal-to-quantization-noise ratio of 6.02 × 16 = 96.3 dB.

When the input signal is a full-amplitude sine wave the distribution of the signal is no longer uniform, and the corresponding equation is instead

$$\mathrm{SQNR} \approx  1.761 + 6.02 \cdot Q \ \mathrm{dB} \,\!$$

Here, the quantization noise is once again assumed to be uniformly distributed. When the input signal has a high amplitude and a wide frequency spectrum, this is the case. In this case a 16-bit ADC has a maximum signal-to-noise ratio of 98.09 dB. The 1.761 difference in signal-to-noise only occurs due to the signal being a full-scale sine wave instead of a triangle or sawtooth.

For complex signals in high-resolution ADCs this is an accurate model. For low-resolution ADCs, low-level signals in high-resolution ADCs, and for simple waveforms the quantization noise is not uniformly distributed, making this model inaccurate. In these cases the quantization noise distribution is strongly affected by the exact amplitude of the signal.

The calculations are relative to full-scale input. For smaller signals, the relative quantization distortion can be very large. To circumvent this issue, analog companding can be used, but this can introduce distortion.

== Design ==
=== Granular distortion and overload distortion ===
Often, the design of a quantizer involves supporting only a limited range of possible output values and performing clipping to limit the output to this range whenever the input exceeds the supported range. The error introduced by this clipping is referred to as overload distortion. Within the extreme limits of the supported range, the amount of spacing between the selectable output values of a quantizer is referred to as its granularity, and the error introduced by this spacing is referred to as granular distortion. It is common for the design of a quantizer to involve determining the proper balance between granular distortion and overload distortion. For a given supported number of possible output values, reducing the average granular distortion may involve increasing the average overload distortion, and vice versa. A technique for controlling the amplitude of the signal (or, equivalently, the quantization step size $\Delta$) to achieve the appropriate balance is the use of automatic gain control (AGC). However, in some quantizer designs, the concepts of granular error and overload error may not apply (e.g., for a quantizer with a limited range of input data or with a countably infinite set of selectable output values).

=== Rate–distortion quantizer design ===
A scalar quantizer, which performs a quantization operation, can ordinarily be decomposed into two stages:

Classification
A process that classifies the input signal range into $M$ non-overlapping intervals $\{I_k\}_{k=1}^{M}$, by defining $M-1$ decision boundary values $\{b_k\}_{k=1}^{M-1}$, such that $I_k = [b_{k-1}~,~b_k)$ for $k = 1,2,\ldots,M$, with the extreme limits defined by $b_0 = -\infty$ and $b_M = \infty$. All the inputs $x$ that fall in a given interval range $I_k$ are associated with the same quantization index $k$.
Reconstruction
Each interval $I_k$ is represented by a reconstruction value $y_k$ which implements the mapping $x \in I_k \Rightarrow y = y_k$.

These two stages together comprise the mathematical operation of $y = Q(x)$.

Entropy coding techniques can be applied to communicate the quantization indices from a source encoder that performs the classification stage to a decoder that performs the reconstruction stage. One way to do this is to associate each quantization index $k$ with a binary codeword $c_k$. An important consideration is the number of bits used for each codeword, denoted here by $\mathrm{length}(c_k)$. As a result, the design of an $M$-level quantizer and an associated set of codewords for communicating its index values requires finding the values of $\{b_k\}_{k=1}^{M-1}$, $\{c_k\}_{k=1}^{M}$ and $\{y_k\}_{k=1}^{M}$ which optimally satisfy a selected set of design constraints such as the bit rate $R$ and distortion $D$.

Assuming that an information source $S$ produces random variables $X$ with an associated PDF $f(x)$, the probability $p_k$ that the random variable falls within a particular quantization interval $I_k$ is given by:

$$p_k = P[x \in I_k] = \int_{b_{k-1}}^{b_k} f(x)dx$$.

The resulting bit rate $R$, in units of average bits per quantized value, for this quantizer can be derived as follows:

$$R = \sum_{k=1}^{M} p_k \cdot \mathrm{length}(c_{k}) = \sum_{k=1}^{M} \mathrm{length}(c_k) \int_{b_{k-1}}^{b_k} f(x)dx$$.

If it is assumed that distortion is measured by mean squared error, (Note: Other distortion measures can also be considered, although mean squared error is a popular one.) the distortion D, is given by:

$$D = E[(x-Q(x))^2] = \int_{-\infty}^{\infty} (x-Q(x))^2f(x)dx = \sum_{k=1}^{M} \int_{b_{k-1}}^{b_k} (x-y_k)^2 f(x)dx$$.

A key observation is that rate $R$ depends on the decision boundaries $\{b_k\}_{k=1}^{M-1}$ and the codeword lengths $\{\mathrm{length}(c_k)\}_{k=1}^{M}$, whereas the distortion $D$ depends on the decision boundaries $\{b_k\}_{k=1}^{M-1}$ and the reconstruction levels $\{y_k\}_{k=1}^{M}$.

After defining these two performance metrics for the quantizer, a typical rate–distortion formulation for a quantizer design problem can be expressed in one of two ways:

1. Given a maximum distortion constraint $D \le D_\max$, minimize the bit rate $R$
2. Given a maximum bit rate constraint $R \le R_\max$, minimize the distortion $D$

Often the solution to these problems can be equivalently (or approximately) expressed and solved by converting the formulation to the unconstrained problem $\min\left\{ D + \lambda \cdot R \right\}$ where the Lagrange multiplier $\lambda$ is a non-negative constant that establishes the appropriate balance between rate and distortion. Solving the unconstrained problem is equivalent to finding a point on the convex hull of the family of solutions to an equivalent constrained formulation of the problem. However, finding a solution – especially a closed-form solution – to any of these three problem formulations can be difficult. Solutions that do not require multi-dimensional iterative optimization techniques have been published for only three PDFs: the uniform, exponential, and Laplacian distributions. Iterative optimization approaches can be used to find solutions in other cases.

Note that the reconstruction values $\{y_k\}_{k=1}^{M}$ affect only the distortion – they do not affect the bit rate – and that each individual $y_k$ makes a separate contribution $d_k$ to the total distortion as shown below:

$$D = \sum_{k=1}^{M} d_k$$

where

$$d_k = \int_{b_{k-1}}^{b_k} (x-y_k)^2 f(x)dx$$

This observation can be used to ease the analysis – given the set of $\{b_k\}_{k=1}^{M-1}$ values, the value of each $y_k$ can be optimized separately to minimize its contribution to the distortion $D$.

For the mean-square error distortion criterion, it can be easily shown that the optimal set of reconstruction values $\{y^*_k\}_{k=1}^{M}$ is given by setting the reconstruction value $y_k$ within each interval $I_k$ to the conditional expected value (also referred to as the centroid) within the interval, as given by:

$$y^*_k = \frac1{p_k} \int_{b_{k-1}}^{b_k} x f(x)dx$$.

The use of sufficiently well-designed entropy coding techniques can result in the use of a bit rate that is close to the true information content of the indices $\{k\}_{k=1}^{M}$, such that effectively

$$\mathrm{length}(c_k) \approx -\log_2\left(p_k\right)$$

and therefore

$$R = \sum_{k=1}^{M} -p_k \cdot \log_2\left(p_k\right)$$.

The use of this approximation can allow the entropy coding design problem to be separated from the design of the quantizer itself. Modern entropy coding techniques such as arithmetic coding can achieve bit rates that are very close to the true entropy of a source, given a set of known (or adaptively estimated) probabilities $\{p_k\}_{k=1}^{M}$.

In some designs, rather than optimizing for a particular number of classification regions $M$, the quantizer design problem may include optimization of the value of $M$ as well. For some probabilistic source models, the best performance may be achieved when $M$ approaches infinity.

=== Neglecting the entropy constraint: Lloyd–Max quantization ===
In the above formulation, if the bit rate constraint is neglected by setting $\lambda$ equal to 0, or equivalently if it is assumed that a fixed-length code (FLC) will be used to represent the quantized data instead of a variable-length code (or some other entropy coding technology such as arithmetic coding that is better than an FLC in the rate–distortion sense), the optimization problem reduces to minimization of distortion $D$ alone.

The indices produced by an $M$-level quantizer can be coded using a fixed-length code using $R = \lceil \log_2 M \rceil$ bits/symbol. For example, when $M=$256 levels, the FLC bit rate $R$ is 8 bits/symbol. For this reason, such a quantizer has sometimes been called an 8-bit quantizer. However, using an FLC eliminates the compression improvement that can be obtained by use of better entropy coding.

Assuming an FLC with $M$ levels, the rate–distortion minimization problem can be reduced to distortion minimization alone. The reduced problem can be stated as follows: given a source $X$ with PDF $f(x)$ and the constraint that the quantizer must use only $M$ classification regions, find the decision boundaries $\{b_k\}_{k=1}^{M-1}$ and reconstruction levels $\{y_k\}_{k=1}^M$ to minimize the resulting distortion

$$D=E[(x-Q(x))^2] = \int_{-\infty}^{\infty} (x-Q(x))^2f(x)dx = \sum_{k=1}^{M} \int_{b_{k-1}}^{b_k} (x-y_k)^2 f(x)dx =\sum_{k=1}^{M} d_k$$.

Finding an optimal solution to the above problem results in a quantizer sometimes called a MMSQE (minimum mean-square quantization error) solution, and the resulting PDF-optimized (non-uniform) quantizer is referred to as a Lloyd–Max quantizer, named after two people who independently developed iterative methods to solve the two sets of simultaneous equations resulting from ${\partial D / \partial b_k} = 0$ and ${\partial D/ \partial y_k} = 0$, as follows:

$${\partial D \over\partial b_k} = 0 \Rightarrow b_k = {y_k + y_{k+1} \over 2}$$,

which places each threshold at the midpoint between each pair of reconstruction values, and

$${\partial D \over\partial y_k} = 0 \Rightarrow y_k = { \int_{b_{k-1}}^{b_k} x f(x) dx \over \int_{b_{k-1}}^{b_k} f(x)dx } = \frac1{p_k} \int_{b_{k-1}}^{b_k} x f(x) dx$$

which places each reconstruction value at the centroid (conditional expected value) of its associated classification interval.

Lloyd's Method I algorithm, originally described in 1957, can be generalized in a straightforward way for application to vector data. This generalization results in the Linde–Buzo–Gray (LBG) or k-means classifier optimization methods. Moreover, the technique can be further generalized in a straightforward way to also include an entropy constraint for vector data.

=== Uniform quantization and the 6 dB/bit approximation ===
The Lloyd–Max quantizer is actually a uniform quantizer when the input PDF is uniformly distributed over the range $[y_1-\Delta/2,~y_M+\Delta/2)$. However, for a source that does not have a uniform distribution, the minimum-distortion quantizer may not be a uniform quantizer. The analysis of a uniform quantizer applied to a uniformly distributed source can be summarized in what follows:

A symmetric source X can be modelled with $f(x)= \tfrac1{2X_{\max}}$, for $x \in [-X_{\max} , X_{\max}]$ and 0 elsewhere. The step size $\Delta = \tfrac {2X_{\max}} {M}$ and the signal to quantization noise ratio (SQNR) of the quantizer is

$${\rm SQNR}= 10\log_{10}{\frac {\sigma_x^2}{\sigma_q^2}} = 10\log_{10}{\frac {(M\Delta)^2/12}{\Delta^2/12}}= 10\log_{10}M^2= 20\log_{10}M$$.

For a fixed-length code using $N$ bits, $M=2^N$, resulting in ${\rm SQNR}= 20\log_{10}{2^N} = N\cdot(20\log_{10}2) = N\cdot 6.0206\,\rm{dB}$,

or approximately 6 dB per bit. For example, for $N$=8 bits, $M$=256 levels and SQNR = 8×6 = 48 dB; and for $N$=16 bits, $M$=65536 and SQNR = 16×6 = 96 dB. The property of 6 dB improvement in SQNR for each extra bit used in quantization is a well-known figure of merit. However, it must be used with care: this derivation is only for a uniform quantizer applied to a uniform source. For other source PDFs and other quantizer designs, the SQNR may be somewhat different from that predicted by 6 dB/bit, depending on the type of PDF, the type of source, the type of quantizer, and the bit rate range of operation.

However, it is common to assume that for many sources, the slope of a quantizer SQNR function can be approximated as 6 dB/bit when operating at a sufficiently high bit rate. At asymptotically high bit rates, cutting the step size in half increases the bit rate by approximately 1 bit per sample (because 1 bit is needed to indicate whether the value is in the left or right half of the prior double-sized interval) and reduces the mean squared error by a factor of 4 (i.e., 6 dB) based on the $\Delta^2/12$ approximation.

At asymptotically high bit rates, the 6 dB/bit approximation is supported for many source PDFs by rigorous theoretical analysis. Moreover, the structure of the optimal scalar quantizer (in the rate–distortion sense) approaches that of a uniform quantizer under these conditions.

== In other fields ==
Many physical quantities are actually quantized by physical entities. Examples of fields where this limitation applies include electronics (due to electrons), optics (due to photons), biology (due to DNA), physics (due to Planck limits) and chemistry (due to molecules).

== See also ==
- Beta encoder
- Color quantization
- Data binning
- Discretization
- Discretization error
- Least count
- Posterization
- Pulse-code modulation
- Quantile
- Quantization (image processing)
- Regression dilution – a bias in parameter estimates caused by errors such as quantization in the explanatory or independent variable
- Sample abundance
