= Continuously variable slope delta modulation =

Voice coding method

Continuously variable slope delta modulation (CVSD or CVSDM) is a voice coding method. It is a delta modulation with variable step size (i.e., special case of adaptive delta modulation), first proposed by Greefkes and Riemens in 1970.

CVSD encodes at 1 bit per sample, so that audio sampled at 16 kHz is encoded at 16 kbit/s.

The encoder maintains a reference sample and a step size. Each input sample is compared to the reference sample. If the input sample is larger, the encoder emits a 1 bit and adds the step size to the reference sample. If the input sample is smaller, the encoder emits a 0 bit and subtracts the step size from the reference sample. The encoder also keeps the previous N bits of output (N = 3 or N = 4 are very common) to determine adjustments to the step size; if the previous N bits are all 1s or 0s, the step size is increased. Otherwise, the step size is decreased (usually in an exponential manner, with $\tau$ being in the range of 5 ms). The step size is adjusted for every input sample processed.

To allow for bit errors to fade out and to allow (re)synchronization to an ongoing bitstream, the output register (which keeps the reference sample) is normally realized as a leaky integrator with a time constant ($\tau$) of about 1 ms.

The decoder reverses this process, starting with the reference sample, and adding or subtracting the step size according to the bit stream. The sequence of adjusted reference samples are the reconstructed waveform, and the step size is adjusted according to the same all-1s-or-0s logic as in the encoder.

Adaptation of step size allows one to avoid slope overload (step of quantization increases when the signal rapidly changes) and decreases granular noise when the signal is constant (decrease of step of quantisation).

CVSD is sometimes called a compromise between simplicity, low bitrate, and quality. Common bitrates are 9.6–128 kbit/s.

Like other delta-modulation techniques, the output of the decoder does not exactly match the original input to the encoder.

== Applications ==
12 kbit/s CVSD is used by Motorola's SECURENET line of digitally encrypted two-way radio products.

16 and 32 kbit/s CVSD were used by military TRI-TAC digital telephones (DNVT, DSVT) for use in deployed areas to provide voice recognition quality audio. 16 kbit/s rates were typically used by US Army forces to conserve bandwidth over tactical links. 32 kbit/s rates were typically used by US Air Force forces for improved voice quality. Also 16 kbit/s CVSD is used for tactical radio communication by NATO forces. Usually voice transmissions are encrypted, in some systems frequency hopping is used.

64 kbit/s CVSD is one of the options to encode voice signals in telephony-related Bluetooth service profiles; e.g., between mobile phones and wireless headsets. The other options are PCM with logarithmic a-law or μ-law quantization, as well as mSBC codec featuring 16 kHz sample rate and best quality.

Numerous arcade games, such as Sinistar and Smash TV, and pinball machines, such as Gorgar or Space Shuttle, play pre-recorded speech through an HC-55516 CVSD decoder.

The Victor 9000 computer used a MC6852-SSDA chip and a CODEC supporting voice coding with CVSD modulation with a sampling rate of about 16KHz.

== See also ==
- Pulse-width modulation
- Delta-sigma modulation
