= Delta modulation =

Signal conversion technique

Fig. 1: Principle of an asynchronous delta pulse-width modulation (PWM). The output signal (blue) is compared with the limits (green). The limits (green) correspond to the reference signal (red), offset by a given value. Every time the output signal reaches one of the limits, the PWM signal (purple) changes state.

Delta modulation (DM, ΔM, or Δ-modulation) is an analog-to-digital and digital-to-analog signal conversion technique used for transmission of voice information where quality is not of primary importance. DM is the simplest form of differential pulse-code modulation (DPCM) where the difference between successive samples is encoded into n-bit data streams. In delta modulation, the transmitted data are reduced to a 1-bit data stream representing either up (↗) or down (↘). Its main features are:

- The analog signal is approximated with a series of segments.
- Each segment of the approximated signal is compared to the preceding bits and the successive bits are determined by this comparison.
- Only the change of information is sent, that is, only an increase or decrease of the signal amplitude from the previous sample is sent whereas a no-change condition causes the modulated signal to remain at the same ↗ or ↘ state of the previous sample.

To achieve high signal-to-noise ratio, delta modulation must use oversampling techniques, that is, the analog signal is sampled at a rate several times higher than the Nyquist rate.

Derived forms of delta modulation are continuously variable slope delta modulation, delta-sigma modulation, and differential modulation. Differential pulse-code modulation is the superset of DM.

== Principle ==
Rather than quantizing the value of the input analog waveform, delta modulation quantizes the difference between the input signal and the integral of all previous quantization steps. This quantized signal effectively represents the derivative of the input signal, so the original signal is recovered by integration, as shown in the block diagram in Fig. 2:

Fig. 2: Block diagram of a Δ-modulator/demodulator (Note: The quantizer is synchronized to some sort of clock in synchronous versions. The original 1947 Deloraine and 1950 Cutler patents and the 1952 Jager paper used some pulse generator to control the quantizer so that the samples were time-quantized. The above asynchronous modulator circuit won't work with ideal elements which have no delay, because the loop would happen instantaneously. But real circuits will unavoidably have some amount of delay or hysteresis, which the above asynchronous modulator circuit would require.)

In its simplest form, the quantizer can be realized with a comparator referenced to 0 (a two-level quantizer), whose output is 1 or -1 depending on whether the quantizer's input is positive or negative. The demodulator contains an integrator (just like the one in the feedback loop) whose output rises or falls with each 1 or -1 received. An optional low-pass filter will remove high frequency zigzags (see the blue output signal of Fig. 1), so only frequencies in the band of interest remain, to recover a smooth cleaned version of the original signal.

Because each sample is only 1 bit, the transmission bit rate equals the sampling rate.

== Transfer characteristics ==
The two sources of noise in delta modulation are slope overload, when step size is too small to track the original waveform, and granularity, when step size is too large. But a 1971 study shows that slope overload is less objectionable compared to granularity than one might expect based solely on SNR measures.

=== Slope overload ===
In delta modulation, there is no limit to the number of pulses of the same sign that may occur, so it is capable of tracking signals of any amplitude without clipping provided that the signal doesn't change too rapidly. However, if an input signal $m(t)$ has a derivative $\dot{m}(t)$ larger than

$|\dot{m}(t)|_{max} = \sigma f_s$,

where $f_s$ is the sampling frequency and $\sigma$ is the quantization step size, then the signal changes too fast, causing slope overload. For example, if the input signal is a cosine wave with frequency $\omega$ and amplitude $A$,

$$m(t)={A\cos (\omega t)}$$,

then its derivative,

$$\dot{m}(t) = -\omega A \sin(\omega t)$$,

can be as large as

$$|\dot{m}(t)|_{max}=\omega A$$.

Thus, slope overload won't occur for a sinusoidal input if

$$\omega A < \sigma f_s$$.

Consequently, a sinusoidal signal can be transmitted without slope overload if its amplitude is not bigger than

$$A_{max}={\sigma f_s \over \omega}$$.

A real input signal may be more complex than a single sinusoid, but this example illustrates how a transmitted signal may be attenuated depending on the sampling frequency, step size, and the input signal's frequency.

While slope overload (also referred to as slope clipping) can be avoided by increasing the quantum step size or sampling rate, very high sampling rates, typically 20 times the highest frequency of interest, are required to achieve the same quality as pulse-code modulation (PCM).

=== Inability to transmit DC ===
Because the modulated signal contains only the derivative of the input, any DC and low-frequency content of the signal is lost (which may be ok for voice and other applications which do not have low frequencies), transmission errors are accumulated, and high-frequency noise is amplified. An improvement to DM called delta-sigma modulation avoids these downsides by rearranging the integrator's position so that the modulated signal represents the amplitude of the input signal instead of just its derivative.

== History ==
The seminal paper combining feedback with oversampling to achieve delta modulation was by F. de Jager of Philips Research Laboratories in 1952. Initial patents include:

- "Communication system utilizing constant amplitude pulses of opposite polarities" by Maurice Deloraine et al. (French patent issued 1946, US patent filed 1947).
- "Differential quantization of communication signals" by C. Chapin Cutler (filed 1950), which describes differential PCM and delta modulation (1-bit DPCM).

== Asynchronous delta modulation ==
The 1947 Deloraine, 1950 Cutler, and 1952 Jager designs were synchronous (or time-quantized). Delta modulation is also possible without a fixed sampling rate. A February 1966 paper by H. Inose "Asynchronous delta-modulation system" uses Schmitt triggers to detect when the input signal exceeds the local demodulator by a predetermined difference, with the benefit of reducing the number of output pulses. A November 1973 paper "Signal Coding Using Asynchronous Delta Modulation" (presented in 1974) investigates an algorithm that varies the sampling rate to transmit fewer samples during periods of small signal variation.

== Adaptive delta modulation ==
Adaptive delta modulation or Continuously variable slope delta modulation (CVSD) is a modification of DM in which the step size is not fixed. Rather, when several consecutive bits have the same direction value, the encoder and decoder assume that slope overload is occurring, and the step size becomes progressively larger. Otherwise, the step size becomes gradually smaller over time.

ADM reduces slope error, at the expense of increasing quantization error. This error can be reduced by using a low-pass filter. ADM provides robust performance in the presence of bit errors meaning error detection and correction are not typically used in an ADM radio design, it is this very useful technique that allows for adaptive-delta-modulation.

Adaptive delta modulation (ADM) was first published by Dr. John E. Abate (Bell Labs Fellow) in his doctoral thesis at NJ Institute Of Technology in 1968. ADM was later selected as the standard for all NASA communications between mission control and space-craft.

In the mid-1980s, Massachusetts audio company DBX marketed a commercially unsuccessful digital recording system based on adaptive delta modulation. See DBX 700.

== Applications ==
=== Video game sound effects ===
The Nintendo Entertainment System's audio processing unit (the Ricoh 2A03 chip) includes a Delta Modulation Channel (DMC) to demodulate percussion and sound effects. The DMC reads delta-encoded audio data via direct memory access into a shift register, which gets shifted out serially into an up/down counter acting as the demodulator's integrator. Because the shift register is clocked by a configurable timer, the audio's frequency can be shifted by adjusting the playback speed. The counter's value is outputted though a 7-bit digital-to-analog converter (DAC). Alternatively, writing PCM samples directly to the counter bypasses the DM demodulation to instead provide low-bit PCM output.

=== Satellite Business Systems 24 kbps delta modulation ===
Delta modulation was used by Satellite Business Systems (SBS) for its voice ports to provide long distance phone service to large domestic corporations with a significant inter-corporation communications need (such as IBM). Each traffic channel had a 32 kbit/s bitrate. This system was in service throughout the 1980s. The voice ports used digitally implemented 24 kbit/s delta modulation with Voice Activity Compression (VAC) and echo suppressors to control the half second echo path through the satellite. They performed formal listening tests to verify the 24 kbit/s delta modulator achieved full voice quality with no discernible degradation as compared to a high quality phone line or the standard 64 kbit/s μ-law companded PCM. This provided an eight to three improvement in satellite channel capacity. IBM developed the Satellite Communications Controller and the voice port functions.

The original proposal in 1974, used a state-of-the-art 24 kbit/s delta modulator with a single integrator and a Shindler Compander modified for gain error recovery. This proved to have less than full phone line speech quality. In 1977, one engineer with two assistants in the IBM Research Triangle Park, NC laboratory was assigned to improve the quality.

The final implementation replaced the integrator with a predictor implemented with a two pole complex pair low-pass filter designed to approximate the long term average speech spectrum. The theory was that ideally the integrator should be a predictor designed to match the signal spectrum. A nearly perfect Shindler Compander replaced the modified version. It was found the modified compander resulted in a less than perfect step size at most signal levels and the fast gain error recovery increased the noise as determined by actual listening tests as compared to simple signal to noise measurements. The final compander achieved a very mild gain error recovery due to the natural truncation rounding error caused by twelve bit arithmetic.

The complete function of delta modulation, VAC and Echo Control for six ports was implemented in a single digital integrated circuit chip with twelve bit arithmetic. A single digital-to-analog converter (DAC) was shared by all six ports providing voltage compare functions for the modulators and feeding sample and hold circuits for the demodulator outputs. A single card held the chip, DAC and all the analog circuits for the phone line interface including transformers.

== See also ==
- Adaptive differential pulse-code modulation
- Analog-to-digital converter (ADC)
- Codec
- Pulse-code modulation
- Pulse-density modulation
  - Delta-sigma modulation
  - Direct Stream Digital

== Sources ==
- Steele, R. (1975). Delta Modulation Systems. London: Pentech Press. ISBN 0-470-82104-3.
- This article incorporates public domain material from Federal Standard 1037C. General Services Administration. Archived from the original on 2022-01-22. (in support of MIL-STD-188).
