= Maurice Deloraine =

French engineer, executive and technical director

Edmond Maurice Deloraine (1898–1991) was a French engineer, executive and technical director of International Telephone and Telegraph. Deloraine was strongly involved in the development of the so-called Huff-Duff.

Deloraine and others made an initial patent for delta modulation called "Communication system utilizing constant amplitude pulses of opposite polarities" (French patent issued 1946, US patent filed 1947).

== Biography ==
Maurice Deloraine grew up in a Protestant environment (Augsburg Lutheranism), his mother from Clairegoutte, his father from Frédéric-Fontaine.

He then studied at the ESPCI Paris (35th class). From 1918 to 1921, he did his military service in Gustave-Auguste Ferrié telecommunications department and, on Ferrié's advice, was hired by Western Electric.Deloraine discovered the American company's French subsidiary, Le Matériel Téléphonique (LMT), as well as Western Electric's American plants and parent company AT&T Corporation.

Western Electric was taken over by the American holding company ITT Inc. in 1925, and in 1928 Deloraine founded a research laboratory alongside LMT, Laboratoires LMT (LLMT). LLMT employed 700 people in 1938, when Deloraine set up a direction-finding division within which, in 1940, he developed the process known as "HF/DF" or High-frequency direction finding, revolutionary in that it made it possible to detect the very short radio signals emitted by German navy submarines without the need for a mobile antenna frame.The name of Deloraine's collaborator, Henri G. Busignies, a specialist in high-frequency radio procedures, is also associated with this process for locating enemy submarines. In October 1940, Deloraine fled to the United States with Busignies and two other LLMT engineers.

The invention of the “Huff-Duff” enabled Allied ships to parry numerous attacks on North Atlantic convoys by enemy submarines, and earned its inventor Dwight D. Eisenhower congratulations.

Back in France, Deloraine got his laboratory up and running again, working on new inventions. Among the most remarkable were the transformation of manual telephone switchboards into automatic ones, and “telephone digitization” (voice encryption in binary). He held a number of positions of responsibility, including president of telephone equipment at LMT, then president of Compagnie générale de constructions téléphoniques.

Maurice Deloraine was mayor of Clairegoutte from 1953 to 1959. Throughout his life, he remained very attached to the “country” of his childhood, and frequently stayed in Clairegoutte.
