= Input offset voltage =

Input needed to zero an amplifier output

The input offset voltage ($V_{os}$) is a parameter defining the differential DC voltage required between the inputs of an amplifier, especially an operational amplifier (op-amp), to make the output zero (for voltage amplifiers, 0 volts with respect to ground or between differential outputs, depending on the output type).

== Details ==
An ideal op-amp amplifies the differential input; if this input difference is 0 volts (i.e. both inputs are at the same voltage), the output should be zero. However, due to manufacturing process, the differential input transistors of real op-amps may not be exactly matched. This causes the output to be zero at a non-zero value of differential input, called the input offset voltage.

Typical values for $V_{os}$ are around 1 to 10 mV for cheap commercial-grade op-amp integrated circuits (IC). This can be reduced to several microvolts if nulled using the IC's offset null pins or using higher-quality or laser-trimmed devices. However, the input offset voltage value may drift with temperature or age.

Input bias current and input offset current also affect the net offset voltage seen for a given amplifier. The voltage offset due to these currents is separate from the input offset voltage parameter and is related to the impedance of the signal source and of the feedback and input impedance networks, such as the two resistors used in the basic inverting and non-inverting amplifier configurations. FET-input op-amps tend to have lower input bias currents than bipolar-input op-amps, and hence incur less offset of this type.

Input offset voltage is symbolically represented by a voltage source that is in series with either the positive or negative input terminal (it is mathematically equivalent either way). Normally input offset voltage is measured in the terms of input voltage applied at the non-inverting terminal to make output zero.

== Compensation ==
Chopper amplifiers actively measure and compensate for the input offset voltage, and may be used when very low offset voltages are required.

Alternatively, a "DC servo loop" can be used (only for AC applications) by feeding back the opamp's average output voltage. This DC average would be an error due to the input offset voltage and can be calculated using an opamp integrator (which regrettably may introduce another error) or similar circuit using an RC low-pass filter with a very low corner frequency. This DC average is subtracted from the opamp's input signal to effectively cancel the input offset voltage.

Older opamps may have "offset null" pins, which connect to a potentiometer, allowing the user to manually adjust its wiper to minimize offset voltage. Unfortunately the offset error may change with temperature and over time. To compensate, a resistor with a known opposing temperature coefficient can be added to cancel out some of the opamp's inherent temperature dependence.
