= High-frequency direction finding =

Electronic equipment for finding radio sources

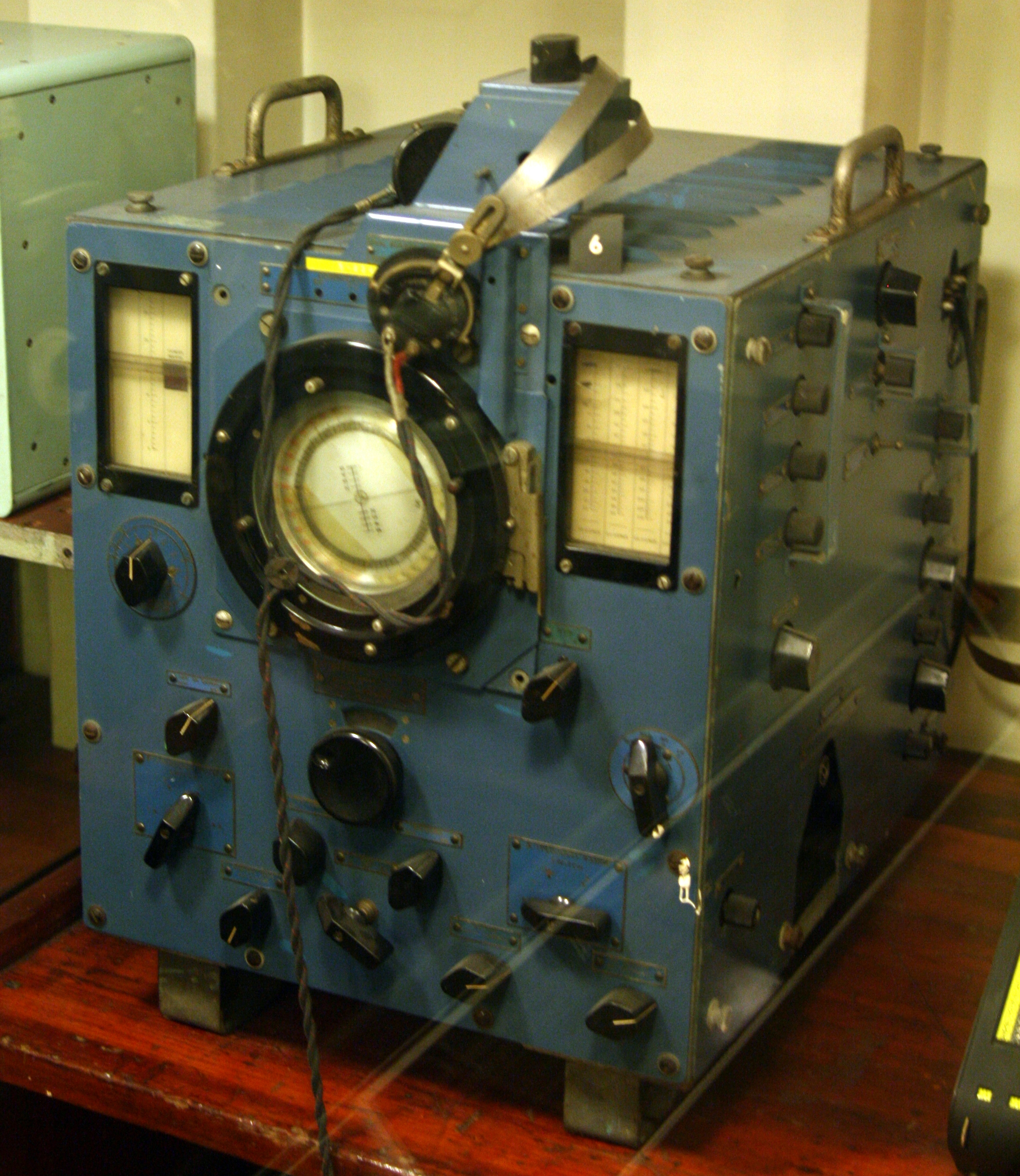
FH4 "Huff-duff" equipment on the museum ship HMS Belfast

High-frequency direction finding, usually known by its abbreviation HF/DF or nickname huff-duff, is a type of radio direction finder (RDF) introduced in World War II. High frequency (HF) refers to a radio band that can effectively communicate over long distances; for example, between U-boats and their land-based headquarters. HF/DF was primarily used to catch enemy radios while they transmitted, although it was also used to locate friendly aircraft as a navigation aid. The basic technique remains in use as one of the fundamental disciplines of signals intelligence, although typically incorporated into a larger suite of radio systems and radars instead of being a stand-alone system.

In earlier RDF systems, the operator mechanically rotated a loop antenna or solenoid and listened for peaks or nulls in the signal to determine the bearing to the transmitter. This took considerable time, on the order of a minute or more. Radio operators could avoid being located by keeping their messages short. In HF/DF systems, a set of antennas received the signal in slightly different locations or angles, and then used the resulting slight differences in the signal to display the bearing on an oscilloscope display. This process was essentially instantaneous, allowing it to catch even the shortest signals, such as from the U-boat fleet.

The system was initially developed by Robert Watson-Watt starting in 1926, as a system for locating lightning. Its role in intelligence was not developed until the late 1930s. In the early war period, HF/DF units were in very high demand, and there was considerable inter-service rivalry involved in their distribution. An early use was by the RAF Fighter Command as part of the Dowding system of interception control, while ground-based units were also widely used to collect information for the Admiralty to locate U-boats. Between 1942 and 1944, smaller units became widely available and were common fixtures on Royal Navy ships. It is estimated HF/DF contributed to 24% of all U-boats sunk during the war.

The basic concept is also known by several alternate names, including cathode-ray direction finding (CRDF), twin path direction finding, and for its inventor, Watson-Watt direction finding or Adcock/Watson-Watt direction finding, when the antenna is considered.

== History ==
=== Before HF/DF ===
Radio direction finding was a widely used technique even before World War I, used for both naval and aerial navigation. The basic concept used a loop antenna, in its most basic form simply a circular loop of wire with a circumference decided by the frequency range of the signals to be detected. When the loop is aligned at right angles to the signal, the signal in the two halves of the loop cancels out, producing a sudden drop in output known as a "null".

Early DF systems used a loop antenna that could be mechanically rotated. The operator would tune in a known radio station and then rotate the antenna until the signal disappeared. This meant that the antenna was now at right angles to the broadcaster, although it could be on either side of the antenna. By taking several such measurements, or using some other form of navigational information to eliminate one of the ambiguous directions, the bearing to the broadcaster could be determined.

In 1907, an improvement was introduced by Ettore Bellini and Alessandro Tosi that greatly simplified the DF system in some setups. The single loop antenna was replaced by two antennas, arranged at right angles. The output of each was sent to its own looped wire, or as they are referred to in this system, a "field coil". Two such coils, one for each antenna, are arranged close together at right angles. The signals from the two antennas generated a magnetic field in the space between the coils, which was picked up by a rotating solenoid, the "search coil". The maximum signal was generated when the search coil was aligned with the magnetic field from the field coils, which was at the angle of the signal in relation to the antennas. This eliminated any need for the antennas to move. The Bellini–Tosi direction finder (B-T) was widely used on ships, although rotating loops remained in use on aircraft as they were normally smaller.

All of these devices took time to operate. Normally the radio operator would first use conventional radio tuners to find the signal in question, either using the DF antenna(s) or on a separate non-directional antenna. Once tuned, the operator rotated the antennas or goniometer looking for peaks or nulls in the signal. Although the rough location could be found by spinning the control rapidly, for more accurate measurements the operator had to "hunt" with increasingly small movements. With periodic signals like Morse code, or signals on the fringe of reception, this was a difficult process. Fix times on the order of one minute were commonly quoted.

Some work on automating the B-T system was carried out just prior to the opening of World War II, especially by French engineers Maurice Deloraine and Henri Busignies, working in the French division of the American Corporation. Their system motorized the search coil as well as a circular display card, which rotated in sync. A lamp on the display card was tied to the output of the goniometer, and flashed whenever it was in the right direction. When spinning quickly, about 120 RPM, the flashes merged into a single (wandering) dot that indicated the direction. The team destroyed all of their work in the French office and left France in 1940, just before Germany invaded, and continued the development in the US.

=== Watson-Watt ===
It had long been known that lightning emits radio signals. The signal is spread across many frequencies but is particularly strong in the longwave spectrum, which was one of the primary radio frequencies for long-range naval communications. Robert Watson-Watt had demonstrated that measurements of these radio signals could be used to track thunderstorms and provide useful long-range warning for pilots and ships. In some experiments he was able to detect thunderstorms over Africa, 2,500 kilometres (1,600 miles) away.

The lightning strikes lasted such a short time that traditional RDF systems using loop antennas could not determine the bearing before they vanished. All that could be determined was an average location that produced the best signal over a long period, incorporating the signal of many strikes. In 1916 Watt proposed that a cathode-ray tube (CRT) could be used as an indicating element instead of mechanical systems, but did not have the ability to test this.

Watt worked at the RAF's Met Office in Aldershot, but in 1924 they decided to return the location for use by other units in the RAF. In July 1924 Watt moved to a new site at Ditton Park near Slough. This site already hosted the National Physical Laboratory (NPL) Radio Section research site. Watt was involved in the Atmospherics branch, making basic studies in the propagation of radio signals through the atmosphere, while the NPL were involved in field strength measurements in the field and direction finding investigations. NPL had two devices used in these studies that would prove critical to the development of huff-duff, an Adcock antenna and a modern oscilloscope.

The Adcock antenna is an arrangement of four monopole masts connected electrically to act as two virtual loop antennas arranged at right angles. By comparing the signals received on the two virtual loops, the direction to the signal can be determined using existing RDF techniques. Researchers had set up the antenna in 1919 but had been neglecting it in favour of smaller designs. These were found to have very poor performance due to the electrical characteristics of the Slough area, which made it difficult to determine if a signal was being received on a straight line or down from the sky. Smith-Rose and Barfield turned their attention back to the Adcock antenna, which had no horizontal component and thus filtered out the "skywaves". In a series of follow-up experiments they were able to accurately determine the location of transmitters around the country.

It was Watt's continuing desire to capture the location of individual lightning strikes that led to the final major developments in the basic huff-duff system. The lab had recently taken delivery of a WE-224 oscilloscope from Bell Labs, which provided easy hook-up and had a persistent phosphor. Working with Jock Herd, in 1926 Watt added an amplifier to each of the two arms of the antenna, and sent those signals into the X and Y channels of the oscilloscope. As hoped, the radio signal produced a pattern on the screen that indicated the direction of the strike, and the slow-decay phosphor gave the operator ample time to measure it before the display faded.

Watt and Herd wrote an extensive paper on the system in 1926, referring to it as "an instantaneous direct-reading radiogoniometer" and stating that it could be used to determine the direction of signals lasting as little as 0.001 seconds. The paper describes the device in depth, and goes on to explain how it could be used to improve radio direction finding and navigation. Despite this public demonstration, and films showing it being used to locate lightning, the concept apparently remained unknown outside the UK. This allowed it to be developed into practical form in secret.

=== Battle of Britain ===
During the rush to install the Chain Home (CH) radar systems prior to the Battle of Britain, CH stations were located as far forward as possible, along the shoreline, in order to provide maximum warning time. This meant that the inland areas over the British Isles did not have radar coverage, relying instead on the Observer Corps (later Royal Observer Corps) for visual tracking in this area. While the Observer Corps were able to provide information on large raids, fighters were too small and too high to be positively identified. As the entire Dowding system of air control relied on ground direction, some solution to locating their own fighters was needed.

The expedient solution to this was the use of huff-duff stations to tune in on the fighter's radios. Every Sector Control, in charge of a selection of fighter squadrons, was equipped with a huff-duff receiver, along with two other sub-stations located at distant points, about 30 miles (48 km) away. These stations would listen for broadcasts from the fighters, compare the angles to triangulate their location, and then relay that information to the control rooms. Comparing the positions of the enemy reported by the Observer Corps and the fighters from the huff-duff systems, the Sector Commanders could easily direct the fighters to intercept the enemy.

To aid in this process, a system known as "pip-squeak" was installed on some of the fighters, at least two per section (with up to four sections per squadron). Pip-squeak automatically sent out a steady tone for 14 seconds every minute, offering ample time for the huff-duff operators to track the signal. It had the drawback of tying up the aircraft's radio while broadcasting its DF signal.

The need for DF sets was so acute that the Air Ministry initially was unable to supply the numbers requested by Hugh Dowding, commander of RAF Fighter Command. In simulated battles during 1938 the system was demonstrated to be so useful that the Ministry responded by providing Bellini-Tosi systems with the promise that CRT versions would replace them as soon as possible. This could be accomplished in the field, simply by connecting the existing antennas to a new receiver set. By 1940 these were in place at all 29 Fighter Command "sectors", and were a major part of the system that won the battle.

=== Battle of the Atlantic ===
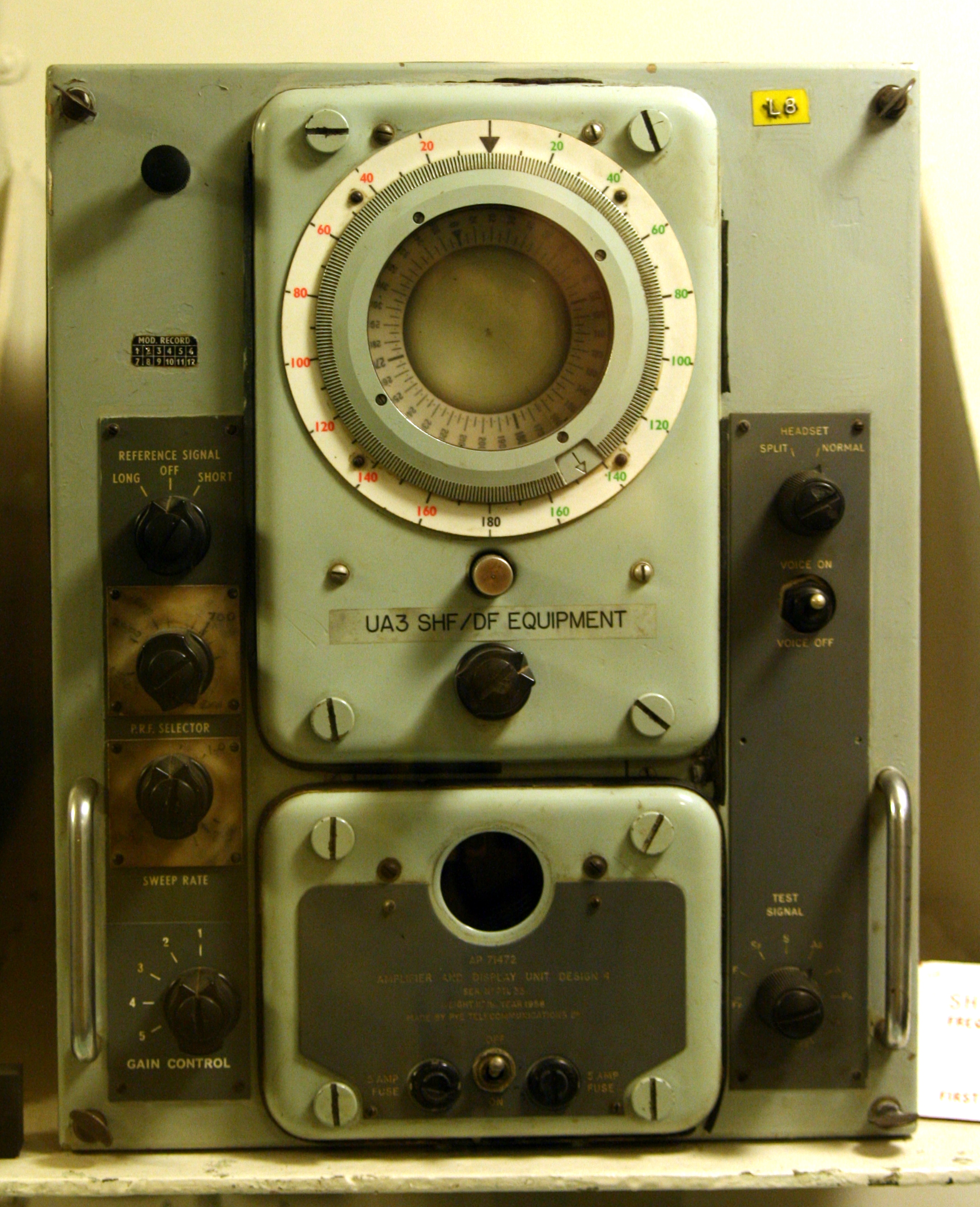
"Super Duff" equipment on the museum ship HMS Belfast. The circular indicator provides a direct reading of the relative bearing from-which signals are received - red numerals for to port of the ship, green for to starboard

Along with sonar ("ASDIC"), intelligence from breaking German codes, and radar, "Huff-Duff" was a valuable part of the Allies' armoury in detecting German U-boats and commerce raiders during the Battle of the Atlantic.

The Kriegsmarine knew that radio direction finders could be used to locate its ships at sea when those ships transmitted messages. Consequently, they developed a system that turned routine messages into short-length messages. The resulting "kurzsignale" was then encoded with the Enigma machine (for security) and transmitted quickly. An experienced radio operator might take about 20 seconds to transmit a typical message. Had the UK been using B-T systems, the only system known to the Germans at the time, determining the location of such a transmission would have required considerable luck. With huff-duff, these messages were more than long enough to easily measure.

At first, the UK's detection system consisted of a number of shore stations in the British Isles and North Atlantic, which would coordinate their interceptions to determine locations. The distances involved in locating U-boats in the Atlantic from shore-based DF stations were so great, and DF accuracy was relatively inefficient, so the fixes were not particularly accurate.

In 1944, a new strategy was developed by Naval Intelligence where localized groups of five shore-based DF stations were built so the bearings from each of the five stations could be averaged to gain a more reliable bearing. Four such groups were set up in Britain: at Ford End in Essex, Anstruther in Fife, Bower in the Scottish Highlands and Goonhavern in Cornwall. It was intended that other groups would be set up in Iceland, Nova Scotia and Jamaica.

Simple averaging was found to be ineffective, and statistical methods were later used. Operators were also asked to grade the reliability of their readings so that poor and variable ones were given less weight than those that appeared stable and well-defined. Several of these DF groups continued into the 1970s as part of the Composite Signals Organisation.

Land-based systems were used because there were severe technical problems operating on ships, mainly due to the effects of the superstructure on the wavefront of arriving radio signals. These problems were overcome under the technical leadership of the Polish engineer Wacław Struszyński, working at the Admiralty Signal Establishment. As ships were equipped, a complex measurement series was carried out to determine these effects, and cards were supplied to the operators to show the required corrections at various frequencies.

By 1942, the availability of CRTs improved and was no longer a limit on the number of huff-duff sets that could be produced. At the same time, improved sets were introduced that included continuously motor-driven tuning, to scan the likely frequencies and sound an automatic alarm when any transmissions were detected. Operators could then rapidly fine-tune the signal before it disappeared. These sets were installed on convoy escorts, enabling them to get fixes on U-boats transmitting from over the horizon, beyond the range of radar. This allowed hunter-killer ships and aircraft to be dispatched at high speed in the direction of the U-boat, which could be located by radar if still on the surface or ASDIC if submerged.

From August 1944, Germany was working on the Kurier system, which would transmit an entire kurzsignale in a burst not longer than 454 milliseconds, too short to be located, or intercepted for decryption, but the system had not become operational by the end of the war.

== Description ==
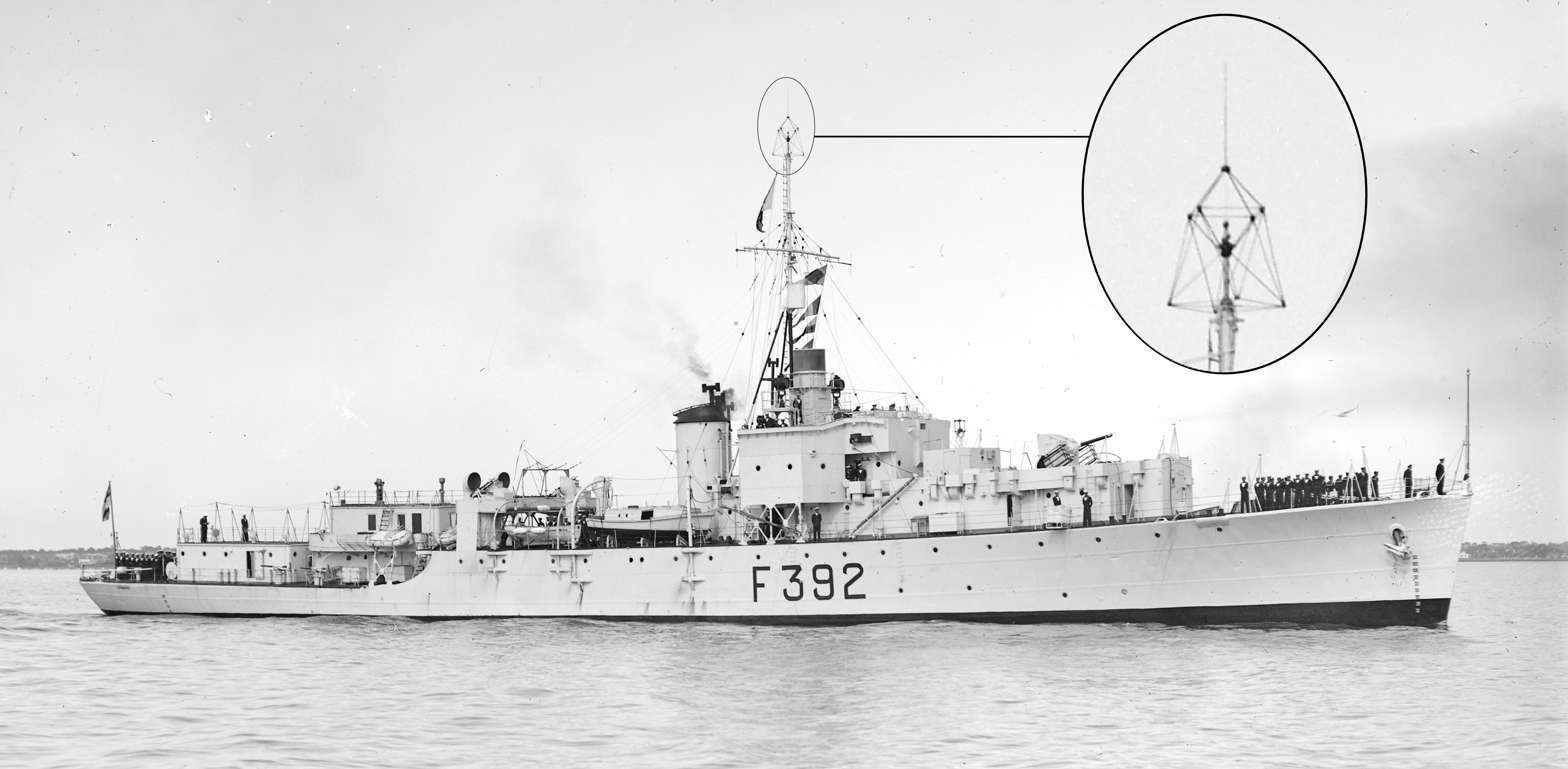
Huff-duff aerial (enlarged) on a Pakistani frigate. The two (square) antenna loops are formed by the diagonal rods at the top of the structure with the rods below for reinforcement purposes only.

The basic concept of the huff-duff system is to send the signal from two aerials into the X and Y channels of an oscilloscope. Normally the Y channel would represent north/south for ground stations, or in the case of the ship, be aligned with the ship's heading fore/aft. The X channel thereby represents either east/west, or port/starboard.

The deflection of the spot on the oscilloscope display is a direct indication of the instantaneous phase and strength of the radio signal. Since radio signals consist of waves, the signal varies in phase at a very rapid rate. If one considers the signal received on one channel, say Y, the dot will move up and down, so rapidly that it would appear to be a straight vertical line, extending equal distances from the center of the display.

When the second channel is added, tuned to the same signal, the dot will move in both the X and Y directions at the same time, causing the line to become diagonal. The radio signal has a finite wavelength, so as it travels through the antenna loops, the relative phase that meets each part of the antenna changes.

This causes the line to be deflected into an ellipse or Lissajous curve, depending on the relative phases. The curve is rotated so that its major axis lies along the bearing of the signal. In the case of a signal to the north-east, the result would be an ellipse lying along the 45/225-degree line on the display. Since the phase is changing while the display is drawing, the resulting displayed shape includes "blurring" that needed to be accounted for.

This leaves the problem of determining whether the signal is north-east or south-west, as the ellipse is equally long on both sides of the display centre-point. To solve this problem a separate aerial, the "sense aerial", was added to this mix. This was an omnidirectional aerial located a fixed distance from the loops about 1/2 of a wavelength away. When this signal was mixed in, the opposite-phase signal from this aerial would strongly suppress the signal when the phase is in the direction of the sense aerial.

This signal was sent into the brightness channel, or Z-axis, of the oscilloscope, causing the display to disappear when the signals were out of phase. By connecting the sense aerial to one of the loops, say the north/south channel, the display would be strongly suppressed when it was on the lower half of the display, indicating that the signal is somewhere to the north. At this point the only possible bearing is the north-east one.

The signals received by the antennas are very small and at high frequency, so they are first individually amplified in two identical radio receivers. This requires the two receivers to be extremely well balanced so that one does not amplify more than the other and thereby change the output signal. For instance, if the amplifier on the north/south antenna has slightly more gain, the dot will not move along the 45 degree line, but perhaps the 30 degree line. To balance the two amplifiers, most set-ups included a "test loop" which generated a known directional test signal.

For shipboard systems, the ship's superstructure presented a serious cause of interference, especially in phase, as the signals moved around the various metal obstructions. To address this, the ship was anchored while a second ship broadcast a test signal from about one mile away, and the resulting signals were recorded on a calibration sheet. The broadcast ship would then move to another location and the calibration would be repeated. The calibration was different for different wavelengths as well as directions; building a complete set of sheets for each ship required significant work.

Naval units, notably the common HF4 set, included a rotating plastic plate with a line, the "cursor", used to help measure the angle. This could be difficult if the tips of the ellipse did not reach the edge of the display, or went off it. By aligning the cursor with the peaks at either end, this became simple. Hash marks on either side of the cursor allowed measurement of the width of the display, and use that to determine the amount of blurring.

== See also ==
- Operation RAFTER – remotely confirming that a superhet radio receiver is listening to a certain frequency
- Wullenweber - "Elephant Cage"
- Y service
