= Integrator =

Component that outputs the integral of its input over time

An integrator in measurement and control applications is an element whose output signal is the time integral of its input signal. It accumulates the input quantity over a defined time to produce a representative output.

Integration is an important part of many engineering and scientific applications. Mechanical integrators are the oldest type and are still used for metering water flow or electrical power. Electronic analogue integrators, which have generally displaced mechanical integrators, are the basis of analog computers and charge amplifiers. Integration can also be performed by algorithms in digital computers.

== Mechanical integrators ==
One simple kind of mechanical integrator is the disk-and-wheel integrator. This functions by placing a wheel on and perpendicular to a spinning disk, held there by means of a freely spinning shaft parallel to the disk. Because the speed at which a part of the disk turns is proportional to its distance from the center, the rate at which the wheel turns is proportional to its distance from the center of the disk. Therefore, the number of turns made by the integrating wheel is equal to the definite integral of the integrating wheel's distance from the center, which is in turn controlled by the motion of the shaft relative to the disk.

== In signal processing circuits ==
A current integrator is an electronic device performing a time integration of an electric current, thus measuring a total electric charge. In combination with time it can be used to determine the average current during an experiment. Feeding current into a capacitor (initialized with zero volts) and monitoring the capacitor's voltage has been used in nuclear physics experiments before 1953 to measure the number of ions received. Such a simple circuit works because the capacitor's current–voltage relation when written in integral form mathematically states that a capacitor's final voltage equals its initial voltage plus the time integral of its current divided by its capacitance:

$$V(t) = V(t_0) + \frac{1}{C}\int_{t_0}^t I(\tau) \, \mathrm{d}\tau$$

More sophisticated current integrator circuits build on this relation, such as the charge amplifier. A current integrator is also used to measure the electric charge on a Faraday cup in a residual gas analyzer to measure partial pressures of gasses in a vacuum. Another application of current integration is in ion beam deposition, where the measured charge directly corresponds to the number of ions deposited on a substrate, assuming the charge state of the ions is known. The two current-carrying electrical leads must to be connected to the ion source and the substrate, closing the electric circuit which in part is given by the ion beam.

A voltage integrator is an electronic device performing a time integration of an electric voltage, thus measuring the total volt-second product. A first-order low-pass filter such as a resistor–capacitor circuit acts like a voltage integrator at high frequencies well above the filter's cutoff frequency.

=== Op amp integrator ===
Figure 1. A circuit diagram of an ideal op amp voltage integrator.

See also Integrator at op amp applications and op amp integrator

An ideal op amp integrator (e.g. Figure 1) is a voltage integrator that works over all frequencies (limited by the op amp's gain–bandwidth product) and provides gain.

==== Drawbacks of ideal op amp integrator ====
- For DC input (f = 0), the capacitive reactance X_{c} is infinite. Because of this, the op amp gets effectively in an open loop configuration, which has infinite open-loop gain (for an ideal op amp, or simply very large for real op amps). Hence, any small input offset voltages are also amplified and appears at output as a large error. This is referred as false triggering and must be avoided.

Thus, an ideal integrator needs to be modified with additional components to reduce the effect of an error voltage in practice. This modified integrator is referred as practical integrator.

==== Practical op amp integrator ====
Main description at: Op amp integrator § Practical circuit

The gain of an integrator at low frequency can be limited to avoid the saturation problem, by shunting the feedback capacitor with a feedback resistor. This practical integrator acts as a low-pass filter with constant gain in its low frequency pass band. It only performs integration in high frequencies, not in low frequencies, so bandwidth for integrating is limited.

== Applications ==
- Integrating circuits are most commonly used in analog-to-digital converters, ramp generators, and also in wave shaping applications.
- Op-amp integrating amplifiers are used to perform calculus operations in analog computers.
- A totalizer in the industrial instrumentation trade integrates a signal representing water flow, producing a signal representing the total quantity of water that has passed by the flow meter.

== In software ==
- Integrators may also be software components.
- In some computational physics computer simulations, such as numerical weather prediction, molecular dynamics, flight simulators, reservoir simulation, noise barrier design, architectural acoustics, and electronic circuit simulation, an integrator is a numerical method for integrating trajectories from forces (and thereby accelerations) that are only calculated at discrete time steps.

== Mechanical integrators ==
Mechanical integrators were key elements in the mechanical differential analyser, used to solve practical physical problems. Mechanical integration mechanisms were also used in control systems such as regulating flows or temperature in industrial processes. Mechanisms such as the ball-and-disk integrator were used both for computation in differential analysers and as components of instruments such as naval gun directors, flow totalizers and others. A planimeter is a mechanical device used for calculating the definite integral of a curve given in graphical form, or more generally finding the area of a closed curve. An integraph is used to plot the indefinite integral of a function given in graphical form.

== See also ==
- Differentiator
- Digital differential analyzer
- Fractional-order integrator
- Integrating ADC
- Low-pass filter
- Operational amplifier
- Signal processing
