= Ramp generator =

In electronics and electrical engineering, a ramp generator is a circuit that creates a linear rising or falling output with respect to time. The output variable is usually voltage, although current ramps can be created. Linear ramp generators are also known as sweep generators

Ramp generators produces a sawtooth wave form, Suppose a 3V is applied to input of a comparator of X terminal and ramp generator at Y terminal. the ramp generator starts increasing its voltage but, still lower than input X terminal of the comparator the output shall be 1, As soon as the ramp voltage is equal to or more than X, comparator output goes low.

== Applications ==
Voltage and current linear ramp generator find wide application in instrumentation and communication systems. Ramp generators used in electrical generators or electric motors to avoid transients when changing a load. Some ramp generators present also the possibility to change the start-up and return flow time.

== Implementation ==
Originally, ramp generators were implemented as analog hardware devices.
