= Henri G. Busignies =

French electrical engineer (1905–1981)

- Born: 29 December 1905; Sceaux, Hauts-de-Seine, France
- Died: 20 June 1981 (aged 75); Antibes, France
- Known for: Radar
- Awards: IRI Medal (1971); IEEE Edison Medal (1977)
- Scientific career
- Fields: Electrical engineer

Henri Gaston Busignies (29 December 1905 – 20 June 1981) was a French-born American electrical engineer who made major contributions to radar, radio communication, and radio navigation. He held 140 patents, many of them secret.

== Early life and education ==
Busignies became interested in amateur radio at an early age, and graduated from the Jules Ferry College in Versailles. In 1926 he received his degree in electrical engineering from the Institut Normal Electro Technique in Paris, having obtained his first patent, for a radio compass.

== Career ==
In 1928 Busignies joined ITT Corporation's Paris Laboratories, where he developed radio direction finders, airplane radio navigation devices, and early radar systems. In 1936 his equipment automatically guided an airplane from Paris to Réunion island off the coast of Madagascar, in the first practical demonstration of an aircraft guidance system.

During World War II his inventions were instrumental in radio direction finding, including four secret patents relating to the automatic high-frequency direction finding (Huff-Duff) system used to locate German U-boats. Busignies had escaped from German-occupied Paris with his wife and working models, ultimately making his way to the United States, where the inventions were implemented first along the East Coast, then the West Coast, with another 30 to 40 fixed stations located around the world. About 1,000 smaller systems were installed on aircraft carriers and destroyers, as well as a further 1,500 mobile systems for the Army Signal Corps. He was also closely involved in early development of Moving Target Indication (MTI) radar during the war.

After the war, Busignies remained in the United States, where he rose steadily through ranks of ITT's senior management, ultimately becoming the corporation's Chief Scientist. His inventions included contributions to Identification Friend or Foe (IFF) technology, conical scanning and 3-dimensional radar, gunfire and shell trajectory control, and deception systems. He also played a large role in development of ILS, TACAN, VORTAC, phased arrays for communications, and the use of dipole needles in orbit for reflection of radio waves (Project West Ford). He retired from ITT in 1975.

== Honors ==
Busignies was an IEEE Fellow, and given an honorary Doctor of Science by Newark College of Engineering (1958), and the Brooklyn Polytechnic Institute (1971). He received numerous other awards and honors during his career, including notably the IRI Medal from the Industrial Research Institute (1971), the IEEE Edison Medal (1977), and the Armstrong Medal from the Radio Club of America. He was elected a member of the National Academy of Engineering (1966), and served as chairman of several of its committees.

== Personal life ==
Busignier was married to his wife Cecilie for nearly 50 years. He naturalized as an American citizen in 1953.

He was survived by his wife, their daughter, and two grandchildren.

== Sources ==
- IEEE History Site
- Memorial Tributes: National Academy of Engineering, Volume 2 (1984), pp. 28-34.
