= Companding =

Telecommunications and signal processing technique

A signal before (top) and after μ-law compression (bottom)

In telecommunications and signal processing, companding (occasionally called compansion) is a method of mitigating the detrimental effects of a channel with limited dynamic range. The name is a portmanteau of the words compressing and expanding, which are the functions of a compander at the transmitting and receiving ends, respectively. The use of companding allows signals with a large dynamic range to be transmitted over facilities that have a smaller dynamic range capability. Companding is employed in telephony and other audio applications such as professional wireless microphones and analog recording.

== How it works ==
The dynamic range of a signal is compressed before transmission and is expanded to the original value at the receiver. The electronic circuit that does this is called a compander and works by compressing or expanding the dynamic range of an analog electronic signal such as sound recorded by a microphone. One variety is a triplet of amplifiers: a logarithmic amplifier, followed by a variable-gain linear amplifier, and ending with an exponential amplifier. Such a triplet has the property that its output voltage is proportional to the input voltage raised to an adjustable power.

Companded quantization is the combination of three functional building blocks – namely, a (continuous-domain) signal dynamic range compressor, a limited-range uniform quantizer, and a (continuous-domain) signal dynamic range expander that inverts the compressor function. This type of quantization is frequently used in telephony systems.

In practice, companders are designed to operate according to relatively simple dynamic range compressor functions that are suitable for implementation as simple analog electronic circuits. The two most popular compander functions used for telecommunications are the A-law and μ-law functions.

== Applications ==
Companding is used in digital telephony systems, compressing before input to an analog-to-digital converter, and then expanding after a digital-to-analog converter. This is equivalent to using a non-linear ADC as in a T-carrier telephone system that implements A-law or μ-law companding. This method is also used in digital file formats for better signal-to-noise ratio (SNR) at lower bit depths. For example, a linearly encoded 16-bit PCM signal can be converted to an 8-bit WAV or AU file while maintaining a decent SNR by compressing before the transition to 8-bit and expanding after conversion back to 16-bit. This is effectively a form of lossy audio data compression.

Professional wireless microphones do this since the dynamic range of the microphone audio signal itself is larger than the dynamic range provided by radio transmission. Companding also reduces the noise and crosstalk levels at the receiver.

Companders are used in concert audio systems and in some noise reduction schemes.

== History ==
The use of companding in an analog picture transmission system was patented by A. B. Clark of AT&T in 1928 (filed in 1925):

In the transmission of pictures by electric currents, the method which consists in sending currents varied in a non-linear relation to the light values of the successive elements of the picture to be transmitted, and at the receiving end exposing corresponding elements of a sensitive surface to light varied in inverse non-linear relation to the received current.

— A. B. Clark patent

In 1942, Clark and his team completed the SIGSALY secure voice transmission system that included the first use of companding in a PCM (digital) system.

In 1953, B. Smith showed that a nonlinear DAC could be complemented by the inverse nonlinearity in a successive-approximation ADC configuration, simplifying the design of digital companding systems.

In 1970, H. Kaneko developed the uniform description of segment (piecewise linear) companding laws that had by then been adopted in digital telephony.

In the 1980s and 1990s, many of the music equipment manufacturers (Roland, Yamaha, Korg) used companding when compressing the library waveform data in their digital synthesizers. However, exact algorithms are unknown, neither if any of the manufacturers ever used the Companding scheme which is described in this article. The only known thing is that manufacturers did use data compression in the mentioned time period and that some people refer to it as companding while in reality it might mean something else, for example data compression and expansion. This dates back to the late '80s when memory chips were often one of the most costly components in the instrument. Manufacturers usually quoted the amount of memory in its compressed form: i.e. 24 MB of physical waveform ROM in a Korg Trinity is actually 48 MB when uncompressed. Similarly, Roland SR-JV expansion boards were usually advertised as 8 MB boards with '16 MB-equivalent content'. Careless copying of this technical information, omitting the equivalence reference, can often cause confusion.
