= Signal compression =

Signal compression is the use of various techniques to increase the quality or quantity of signal parameters transmitted through a given telecommunications channel.

Types of signal compression include:

- Bandwidth compression
- Data compression
- Dynamic range compression
- Gain compression
- Image compression
- Lossy compression
- One-way compression function
