= Integral linearity =

A measurement system consists of a sensor, to input the physical parameter that is of interest, and an output to a medium that is suitable for reading by the system that needs to know the value of the parameter. (This could be a device to convert the temperature of the surrounding air or water into the visually readable height of a column of mercury in a small tube, for example; but the conversion could also be made to an electronic encoding of the parameter, for reading by a computer system.)

The integral linearity is then a measure of the fidelity of the conversion that is performed by the measuring system. It is the relation of the output to the input over a range expressed as a percentage of the full-scale measurements. Integral linearity is a measure of the device's deviation from ideal linear behaviour.

The most common denotation of integral linearity is independent linearity.

In the context of a digital-to-analog converter (DAC) or an analog-to-digital converter (ADC), independent linearity is fitted to minimize the deviation with respect to the ideal behaviour with no constraints. Other types of integral linearity place constraints on the symmetry or end points of the linear fit with respect to the actual data.

In the case of position sensors, two general types exist. Differences between the two regarding independent linearity essentially relate to the type of mechanical interface - linear or rotary. For rotary position sensors, as a shaft (or in the case of magnetic sensors, a magnet) is turned over a defined mechanical range in a direction causing an increasing response, an output voltage changes from a minimum to maximum value. The variation from an ideal linear relationship as this device is changed from minimum to maximum range end-points is the independent linearity error. It is measured in a practical sense as deviation of output voltage as a percentage of input voltage with the maximum value as the range is traversed, usually being referred to in a device's specifications. The same description holds for linear position sensors except that a straight rod (or magnet) is moved along the length of the sensor or as it extends from the end of a linear position sensor.

== See also ==
- Integral nonlinearity
