= Integral nonlinearity =

Measure of performance in digital-to-analog and analog-to-digital converters

Integral nonlinearity (acronym INL) is a commonly used measure of performance in digital-to-analog (DAC) and analog-to-digital (ADC) converters. In DACs, it is a measure of the deviation between the ideal output value and the actual measured output value for a certain input code. In ADCs, it is the deviation between the ideal input threshold value and the measured threshold level of a certain output code. This measurement is performed after offset and gain errors have been compensated.

The ideal transfer function of a DAC or ADC is a straight line. The INL measurement depends on what line is chosen as ideal. One common option is the line that connects the endpoints of the transfer function, in other words, the line connecting the smallest and largest measured input/output value. An alternative is to use a best fit line, where one minimizes the average (or alternatively the mean squared) INL.

While the INL can be measured for every possible input/output code, often only the maximal error is provided when reporting the INL of a converter.

== Formulas ==
Transfer funcions of ADC and DAC (ideal and with INL)

=== INL of a DAC ===
The INL of a code $c$ of a DAC with $N_c$ output codes is defined as the absolute value of the difference of the real output voltage minus the ideal value:

$$\mathrm{INL}_{c} = \left| V_{\mathrm{o,ideal}}(c) - V_{\mathrm{o,real}}(c) \right| = \left| (V_{\mathrm{o,max}} - V_{\mathrm{o,min}})\frac{c}{N_c-1} + V_{\mathrm{o,min}}- V_{\mathrm{o,real}}(c) \right|$$

where

$V_{\mathrm{o,max}}$ and $V_{\mathrm{o,min}}$ are the maximum and minimum ideal output voltages of the DAC.

=== INL of an ADC ===
For an ADC, the INL of a code $c$ is defined as the deviation of the mid-points of the quantization steps between the ideal and real transfer function.

$$\mathrm{INL}_{c} = \left| V_{\mathrm{M,ideal}}(c) - V_{\mathrm{M,real}}(c) \right|$$

=== Maximum INL of a converter ===
When referring to the INL of a converter usually the maximum INL maximized over all codes is meant. For the line through the endpoints, the INL of a DAC is

$$\mathrm{INL}_{max} = \max_{c \in \{0, 1, \ldots, N_c-1 \} } \mathrm{INL}_c$$

This INL is measured in volts; one can divide it by the ideal LSB voltage $V_{LSB}$ to get the measurement in LSBs:

$$\mathrm{INL}_{max,norm} = \frac{\mathrm{INL}_{max}}{V_{LSB}}$$

== See also ==
- Differential nonlinearity
- Integral linearity
- Quantization
