= Audio Alchemy =

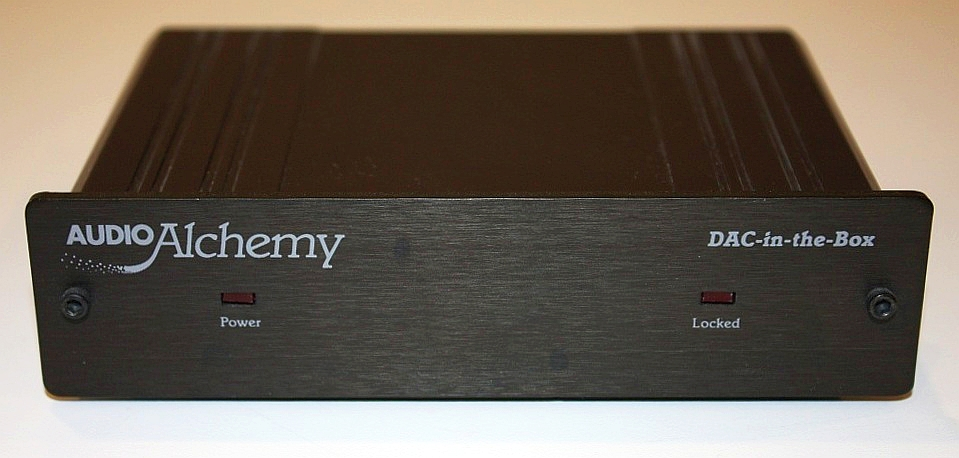
DAC-in-the-Box, an external digital-to-analog converter intended to improve the sound of the user's CD player

Audio Alchemy was a high end audio equipment manufacturer based in California, USA. The company was first formed in the late 1980s, producing many lines of relatively affordable audio products, including CD players, transports, digital audio processors, and amplifiers. It went out of business in the late 1990s, was briefly relaunched in the early 2000s as Alchemy2, then was relaunched under the original Audio Alchemy name in early 2015 with a new line of higher-quality, full-featured audio products. On October 6, 2016 Audio Alchemy was acquired by Elac.

Audio Alchemy products make innovative use of the I²S audio interface, usually reserved for the internal connection between the CD transport and DAC of a CD player. Audio Alchemy brought the interface out to a DIN connector, allowing a very low jitter connection between the CD transport and external DAC, by transmitting the clock signal and the audio signal in parallel. This offers a superior alternative connectivity method to something like S/PDIF, which sees the clock signal embedded into the audio signal. The process of extracting the clock signal from the data stream is where jitter is introduced. This interface is used in several original Audio Alchemy products and in the relaunched company's products. Perpetual Technologies and Camelot Technology also produce products that use the I²S interface.
