= Differential nonlinearity =

Measure of performance in digital converters

Demonstrates A. Differential Linearity where a change in the input produces a corresponding change in output and B. Differential Non-linearity, where the relationship is not directly linear

Differential nonlinearity (acronym DNL) is a commonly used measure of performance in digital-to-analog (DAC) and analog-to-digital (ADC) converters. It is a term describing the deviation between two analog values corresponding to adjacent input digital values. It is an important specification for measuring error in a digital-to-analog converter (DAC); the accuracy of a DAC is mainly determined by this specification. Ideally, any two adjacent digital codes correspond to output analog voltages that are exactly one Least Significant Bit (LSB) apart. Differential non-linearity is a measure of the worst-case deviation from the ideal 1 LSB step. For example, a DAC with a 1.5 LSB output change for a 1 LSB digital code change exhibits 1/2 LSB differential non-linearity. Differential non-linearity may be expressed in fractional bits or as a percentage of full scale. A differential non-linearity greater than 1 LSB may lead to a non-monotonic transfer function in a DAC. It is also known as a missing code.

Differential linearity refers to a constant relation between the change in the output and input. For transducers if a change in the input produces a uniform step change in the output the transducer possess differential linearity. Differential linearity is desirable and is inherent to a system such as a single-slope analog-to-digital converter used in nuclear instrumentation.

== Formula ==
$\text{DNL(i)} = {{V_\text{out}(i+1) - V_\text{out}(i)}\over \text{ideal LSB step width}} - 1$

== Effects of DNL ==
- If the DNL of an ADC is bigger than 1, missing codes appear in the transfer function, i.e. there are codes for which there is no input voltage to get the code at the ADC output.
- If the DNL of a DAC is lower than -1, the transfer function of the DAC becomes non-monotonic. A non-monotonic DAC is especially not desired in closed-loop control application as it may cause stability problems, i.e. it may cause oscillations.

== See also ==
- Integral nonlinearity
