= Digital-to-analog converter =

Device that converts a digital signal into an analog signal

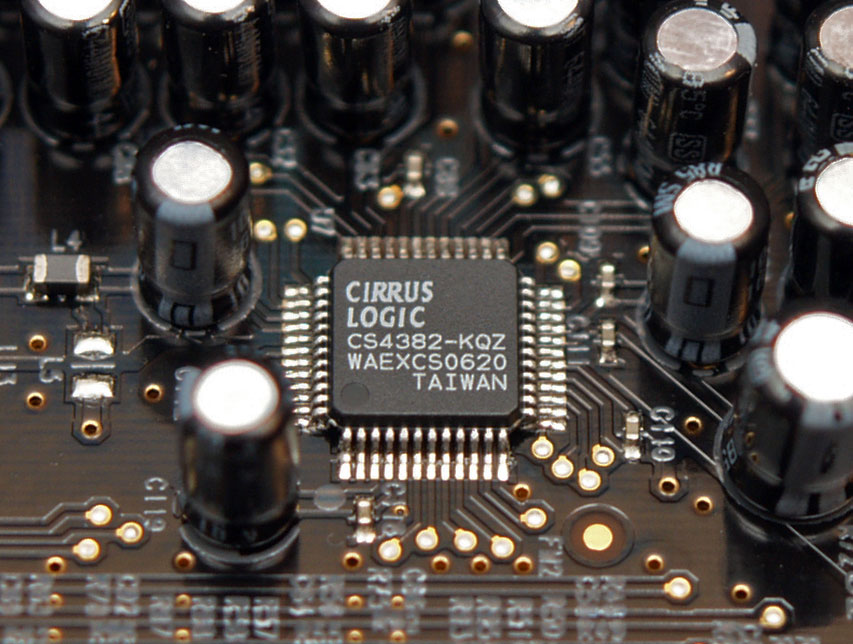
8-channel Cirrus Logic CS4382 digital-to-analog converter as used in a sound card.

In electronics, a digital-to-analog converter (DAC, D/A, D2A, or D-to-A) is a system that converts a digital signal into an analog signal. An analog-to-digital converter (ADC) performs the reverse function.

DACs are commonly used in music players to convert digital data streams into analog audio signals. They are also used in televisions and mobile phones to convert digital video data into analog video signals. These two applications use DACs at opposite ends of the frequency/resolution trade-off. The audio DAC is a low-frequency, high-resolution type, while the video DAC is a high-frequency low- to medium-resolution type.

There are several DAC architectures; the suitability of a DAC for a particular application is determined by figures of merit, including: resolution, maximum sampling frequency and others. Digital-to-analog conversion can degrade a signal, so a DAC should be specified that has insignificant errors in terms of the application.

Due to the complexity and the need for precisely matched components, all but the most specialized DACs are implemented as integrated circuits (ICs). These typically take the form of metal–oxide–semiconductor (MOS) mixed-signal integrated circuit chips that integrate both analog and digital circuits.

Discrete DACs (circuits constructed from multiple discrete electronic components instead of a packaged IC) would typically be extremely high-speed, low-resolution, power-hungry types, as used in military radar systems. Very high-speed test equipment, especially sampling oscilloscopes, may also use discrete DACs.

== Overview ==
Sampled signal.

A DAC converts an abstract finite-precision number (usually a fixed-point binary number) into a physical quantity (e.g., a voltage or a pressure). In particular, DACs are often used to convert finite-precision time series data to a continually varying physical signal.

Provided that a signal's bandwidth meets the requirements of the Nyquist–Shannon sampling theorem (i.e., a baseband signal with bandwidth less than the Nyquist frequency) and was sampled with infinite resolution, the original signal can theoretically be reconstructed from the sampled data. However, an ADC's filtering can't entirely eliminate all frequencies above the Nyquist frequency, which will alias into the baseband frequency range. And the ADC's digital sampling process introduces some quantization error (rounding error), which manifests as low-level noise. These errors can be kept within the requirements of the targeted application (e.g., under the limited dynamic range of human hearing for audio applications).

== Applications ==
A simplified functional diagram of an 8-bit DAC

=== Audio ===
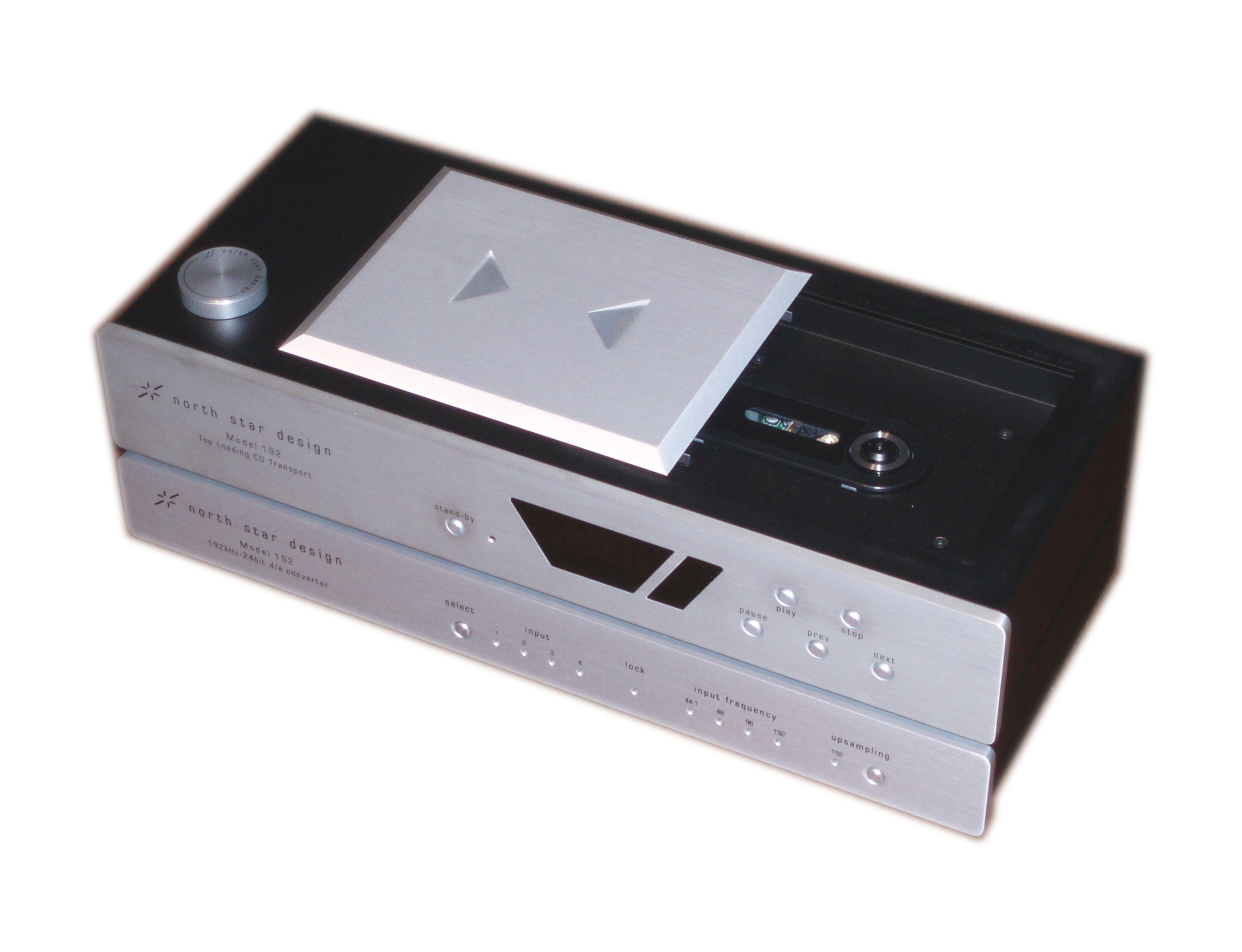
Top-loading CD player (top) and external digital-to-analog converter (bottom) from the same company.

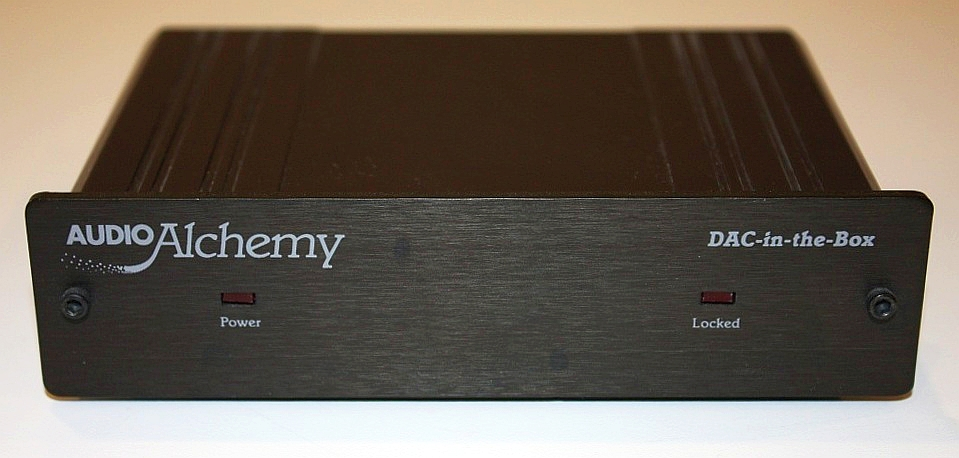
A 1990s external DAC from Audio Alchemy as an add-on for CD players, having only about 12 cm width, intended to improve the sound of older or less expensive players.

In a typical telephone call, a microphone converts speech into an analog electrical signal, which is digitized by an ADC. The resulting digital data can be multiplexed with other digital information for transmission over a shared communication system. At the receiving end, a DAC converts the digital signal back into analog form so it can be amplified and reproduced as sound.

Most modern audio signals are stored in digital form (for example, MP3 or PCM), and in order to be heard through speakers, they must be converted into an analog signal. DACs are therefore found in compact disc (CD) players, digital music players, and PC sound cards.

Specialist standalone DACs can also be found in high-end hi-fi systems. These normally take the digital output of a compatible CD player or dedicated transport (which is basically a CD player with no internal DAC) and convert the signal into an analog line-level output that can then be fed into an amplifier to drive speakers.

Similar digital-to-analog converters can be found in digital speakers, such as USB speakers and in sound cards.

In voice over IP applications, the source must first be digitized for transmission, so it undergoes conversion via an ADC and is then reconstructed into analog using a DAC on the receiving party's end.

==== Early CD player example ====
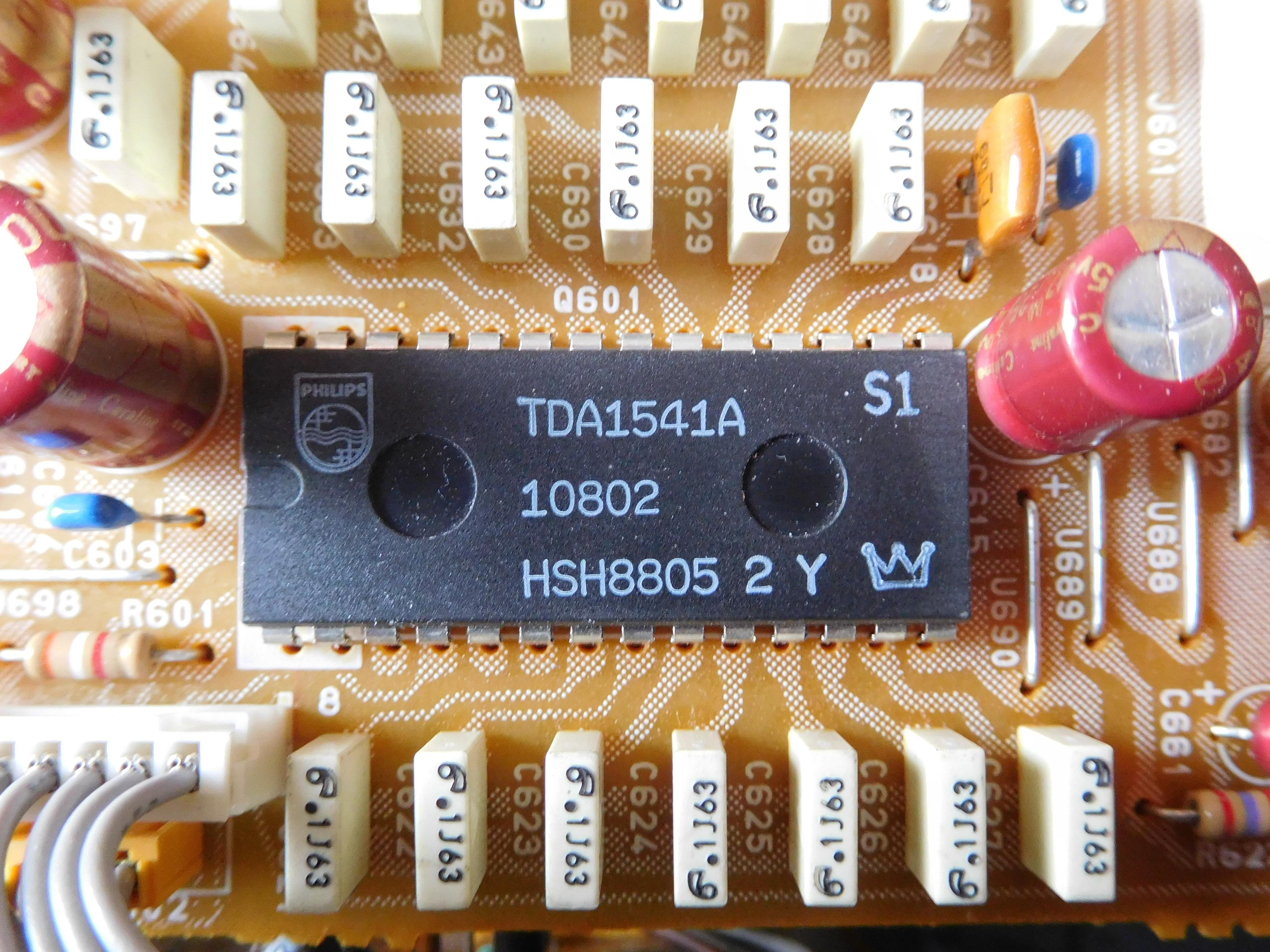
Philips D/A converter in a CD player

Early CD players used oversampling ahead of the D/A converter so that the analog reconstruction filter could be of low order and have a well-controlled phase response. In 1982, Philips described such a system in detail.

A 16-bit, 44.1 kHz input is first applied to a digital interpolation filter and oversampled by a factor of four to 176.4 kHz. The interpolation filter is a 96-tap finite impulse response (FIR) network. Its passband extends over the audio range, while the stopband attenuates the image components that would otherwise appear between 22 kHz and 88 kHz after zero-order hold conversion. The higher sampling rate shifts these images away from the audio band and reduces the requirements on the analog low-pass filter.

The filtered sequence is then represented with 14-bit precision and applied to the Philips TDA1540. This converter employs segmented current sources. The larger current elements are subdivided and switched in a manner that averages element errors over time, an early form of dynamic element matching. The result is improved linearity compared with a straightforward binary-weighted current source.

At the output of the converter, the waveform consists of a staircase approximation to the desired signal, together with residual high-frequency components from the sampling process. A third-order analog low-pass filter follows the converter. This filter removes the remaining out-of-band energy and provides the final smoothing of the waveform.

In 1985, Philips released the TDA1541, which provides full 16-bit resolution and removes the need for the intermediate word-length reduction step. In this and later designs, the same general arrangement (digital interpolation followed by conversion and a relatively simple analog filter) became standard practice in CD playback and appears in later DACs, such as the Crystal CS4397 released in 1999.

=== Video ===
Video sampling tends to work on a completely different scale altogether thanks to the highly nonlinear response both of cathode ray tubes (for which the vast majority of digital video foundation work was targeted) and the human eye, using a "gamma curve" to provide an appearance of evenly distributed brightness steps across the display's full dynamic range - hence the need to use RAMDACs in computer video applications with deep enough color resolution to make engineering a hardcoded value into the DAC for each output level of each channel impractical (e.g. an Atari ST or Sega Genesis would require 24 such values; a 24-bit video card would need 768...). Given this inherent distortion, it is not unusual for a television or video projector to truthfully claim a linear contrast ratio (difference between darkest and brightest output levels) of 1000:1 or greater, equivalent to 10 bits of audio precision, even though it may only accept signals with 8-bit precision and use an LCD panel that only represents 6 or 7 bits per channel.

Video signals from a digital source, such as a computer, must be converted to analog form if they are to be displayed on an analog monitor. As of 2007, analog inputs were more commonly used than digital, but this changed as flat-panel displays with DVI and/or HDMI connections became more widespread. A video DAC is, however, incorporated in any digital video player with analog outputs. The DAC is usually integrated with some memory (RAM), which contains conversion tables for gamma correction, contrast and brightness, to make a device called a RAMDAC.

=== Digital potentiometer ===
A digital potentiometer converts a digital signal into electrical resistance.

=== Mechanical ===
IBM Selectric typewriter uses a mechanical digital-to-analog converter to control its typeball.

A one-bit mechanical actuator assumes two positions: one when on, another when off. The motion of several one-bit actuators can be combined and weighted with a whiffletree mechanism to produce finer steps. The IBM Selectric typewriter uses such a system.

=== Communications ===
DACs are widely used in modern communication systems, enabling the generation of digitally defined transmission signals. High-speed DACs are used for mobile communications and ultra-high-speed DACs are employed in optical communications systems.

== Types ==
The most common types of electronic DACs are:

- The pulse-width modulator (PWM) where a stable current or voltage is switched into a low-pass analog filter with a duration determined by the digital input code. This technique is often used for electric motor speed control and dimming LED lamps.
- Oversampling DACs or interpolating DACs such as those employing delta-sigma modulation, use a pulse density conversion technique with oversampling. Audio delta-sigma DACs are sold with 384 kHz sampling rate and quoted 24-bit resolution, though quality is lower due to inherent noise (see § Figures of merit). Some consumer electronics use a type of oversampling DAC referred to as a 1-bit DAC.
- The binary-weighted DAC, which contains individual electrical components for each bit of the DAC connected to a summing point, typically an operational amplifier. Each input in the summing has powers-of-two weighting with the most current or voltage at the most-significant bit. This is one of the fastest conversion methods, but suffers from poor accuracy because of the high precision required for each individual voltage or current.
  - Switched resistor DAC contains a parallel resistor network. Individual resistors are enabled or bypassed in the network based on the digital input.
  - Switched current source DAC, from which different current sources are selected based on the digital input.
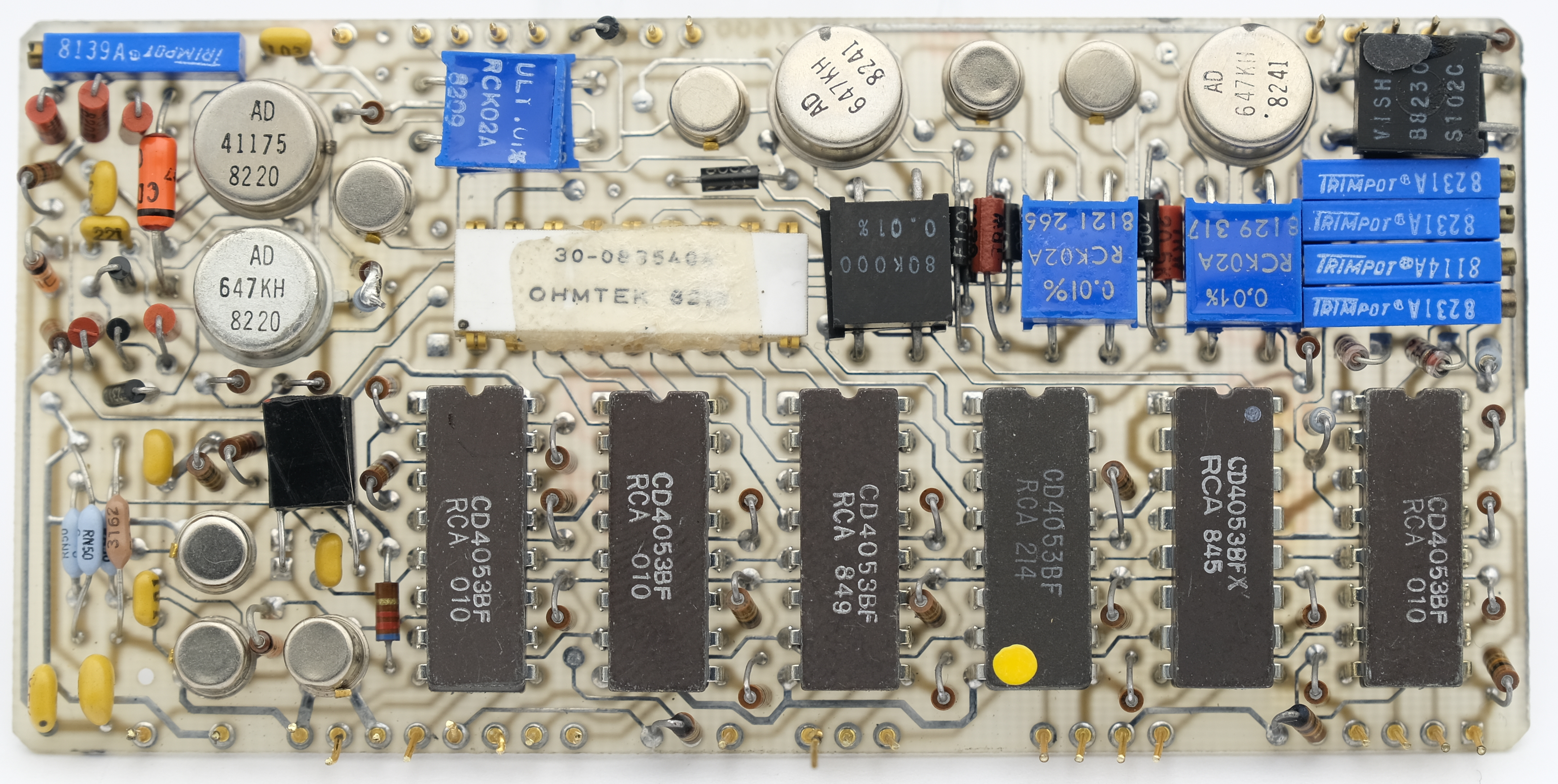
    Current steering DAC - DAC1138KX
  - Switched capacitor DAC contains a parallel capacitor network. Individual capacitors are connected or disconnected with switches based on the input.
  - The R-2R ladder DAC uses a repeating cascaded structure of resistor values R and 2R. This improves the precision due to the relative ease of producing equal-valued matched resistors.
  - A successive‑approximation, or serial charge‑redistribution, DAC constructs its output incrementally during each conversion cycle. Individual bits are evaluated sequentially, beginning with the least significant bit, with each bit cycle effectively halving the voltage on a capacitor through charge sharing. Modern implementations reduce conversion errors caused by capacitor mismatch.
- The thermometer-coded DAC, which contains an equal resistor or current-source segment for each possible value of DAC output. An 8-bit thermometer DAC would have 255 segments, and a 16-bit thermometer DAC would have 65,535 segments. This is a fast and precise DAC architecture, but at the expense of requiring many components which, for practical implementations, fabrication requires high-density IC processes.
- Hybrid DACs, which use a combination of the above techniques in a single converter. Most DAC integrated circuits are of this type due to the difficulty of getting low cost, high speed and high precision in one device. Examples would be a delta-sigma modulator followed by a 4 bit switched-capacitor DAC. These DACs often include dynamic element matching (DEM).
  - The segmented DAC, which combines the thermometer-coded principle for the most significant bits and the binary-weighted principle for the least significant bits. In this way, a compromise is obtained between precision (by the use of the thermometer-coded principle) and number of resistors or current sources (by the use of the binary-weighted principle). The full binary-weighted design means 0% segmentation, the full thermometer-coded design means 100% segmentation.
- Most DACs shown in this list rely on a constant reference voltage or current to create their output value. Alternatively, a multiplying DAC takes a variable input voltage or current as a conversion reference. This puts additional design constraints on the bandwidth of the conversion circuit.
- Modern high-speed DACs have an interleaved architecture, in which multiple DAC cores are used in parallel. Their output signals are combined in the analog domain to enhance the performance of the combined DAC. The combination of the signals can be performed either in the time domain or in the frequency domain.

== Performance ==
The most important characteristics of a DAC are:

Resolution
The number of possible output levels the DAC is designed to reproduce. This is usually stated as the number of bits it uses, which is the binary logarithm of the number of levels. For instance, a 1-bit DAC is designed to reproduce 2 (2^{1}) levels while an 8-bit DAC is designed for 256 (2^{8}) levels. Resolution is related to the effective number of bits, which is a measurement of the actual resolution attained by the DAC. Resolution determines color depth in video applications and audio bit depth in audio applications.
Maximum sampling rate
The maximum speed at which the DACs circuitry can operate and still produce correct output. The Nyquist–Shannon sampling theorem defines a relationship between this and the bandwidth of the sampled signal.
Monotonicity
The ability of a DAC's analog output to move only in the direction that the digital input moves (i.e., if the input increases, the output doesn't dip before asserting the correct output.) This characteristic is very important for DACs used as a low-frequency signal source or as a digitally programmable trim element.
Total harmonic distortion and noise (THD+N)
A measurement of the distortion and noise introduced to the signal by the DAC. It is expressed as a percentage of the total power of unwanted harmonic distortion and noise that accompanies the desired signal.
Dynamic range
A measurement of the difference between the largest and smallest signals the DAC can reproduce, expressed in decibels. This is usually related to resolution and noise floor.

Other measurements, such as phase distortion and jitter, can also be very important for some applications, some of which (e.g., wireless data transmission, composite video) may even rely on accurate production of phase-adjusted signals.

Non-linear PCM encodings (A-law / μ-law, ADPCM, NICAM) attempt to improve their effective dynamic ranges by using logarithmic step sizes between the output signal strengths represented by each data bit. This trades greater quantization distortion of loud signals for better performance of quiet signals.

== Figures of merit ==
- Static performance:
  - Differential nonlinearity (DNL) shows how much two adjacent code analog values deviate from the ideal 1 LSB step.
  - Integral nonlinearity (INL) shows how much the DAC transfer characteristic deviates from an ideal one. That is, the ideal characteristic is usually a straight line; INL shows how much the actual voltage at a given code value differs from that line, in LSBs (1 LSB steps).
  - Gain error
  - Offset error
  - Noise is ultimately limited by the thermal noise generated by passive components such as resistors. For audio applications and in room temperatures, such noise is usually a little less than 1 μV (microvolt) of white noise. This practically limits resolution to less than 20~21 bits, even in 24-bit DACs.
- Frequency domain performance
  - Spurious-free dynamic range (SFDR) indicates in dB the ratio between the powers of the converted main signal and the greatest undesired spur.
  - Signal-to-noise and distortion (SINAD) indicates in dB the ratio between the powers of the converted main signal and the sum of the noise and the generated harmonic spurs
  - i-th harmonic distortion (HDi) indicates the power of the i-th harmonic of the converted main signal
  - Total harmonic distortion (THD) is the sum of the powers of all the harmonics of the input signal
  - If the maximum DNL is less than 1 LSB, then the D/A converter is guaranteed to be monotonic. However, many monotonic converters may have a maximum DNL greater than 1 LSB.
- Time domain performance:
  - Glitch impulse area (glitch energy)

== See also ==
- I²S – Serial communication protocol for two-channel digital audio
