= Elac =

German loudspeaker manufacturer

ELAC Electroacustic
- Type: GmbH
- Industry: Electronics
- Founded: 1926
- Headquarters: Kiel, Germany
- Products: Studio monitors, Loudspeakers, Loudspeaker Drivers Subwoofers
- Website: www.elac.com

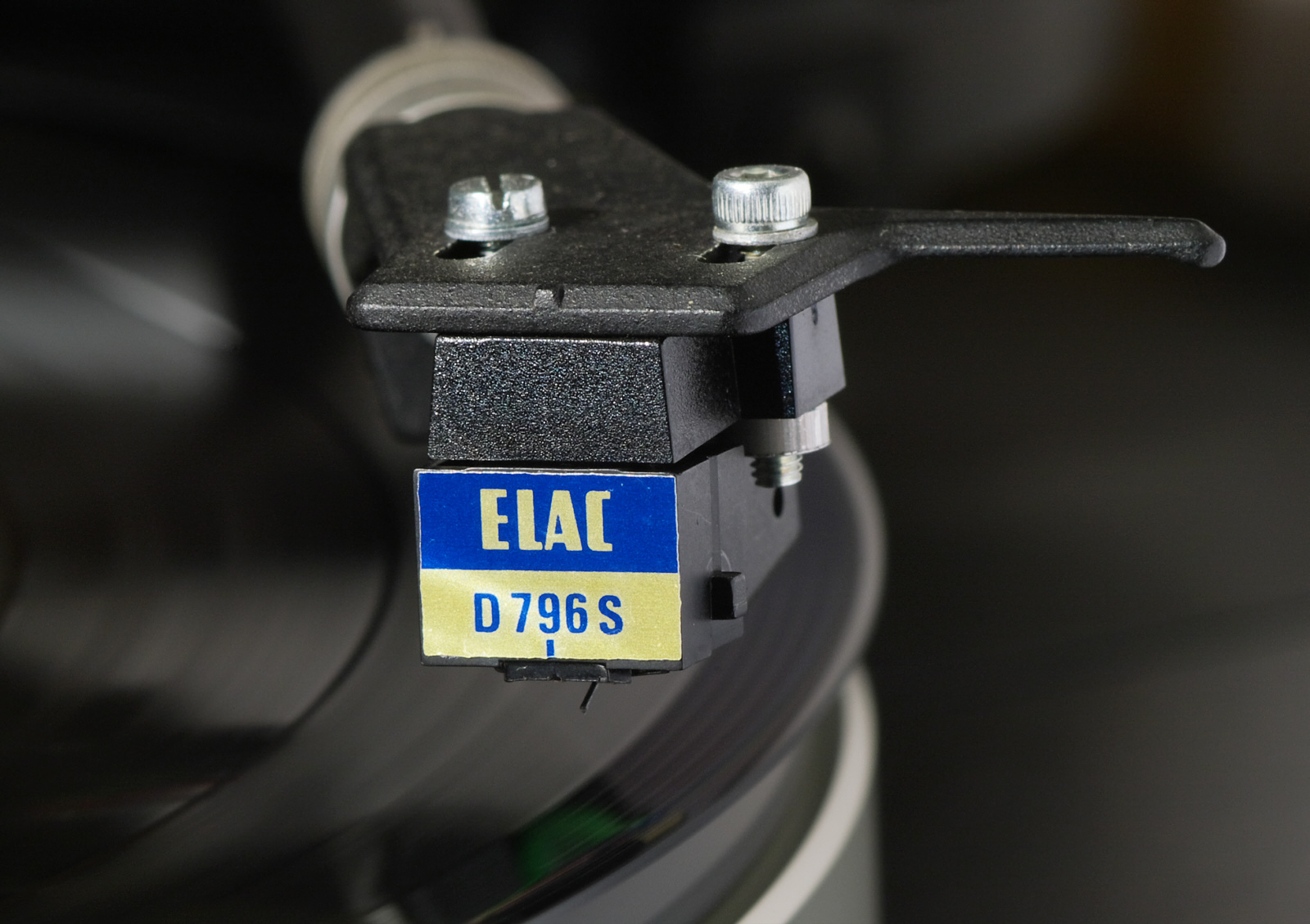
ELAC MM-cartridge

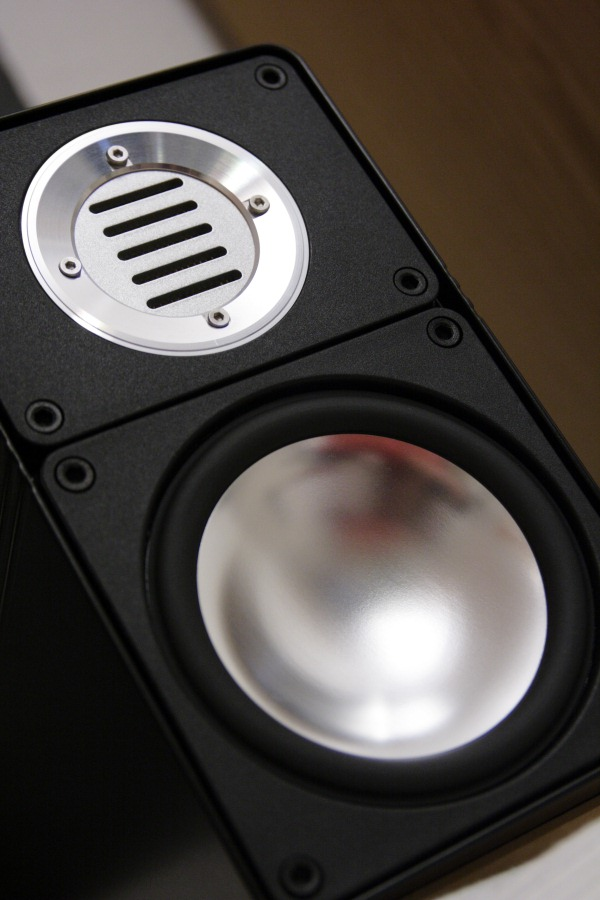
ELAC 310 with JET-tweeter

ELAC is a German loudspeaker manufacturer. It was founded in 1926 as "Electroacustic GmbH".

During World War II, it built electroacoustic devices for the Kriegsmarine and other nautical applications, and the company reached a peak of 5,000 staff.

After the war, the company transitioned to mainly producing consumer goods, initially building sewing machines and later transitioning into consumer electronics, though it maintained its nautical division. It also distributed goods from foreign firms such as Sony, Fisher Electronics, and Nakamichi within Germany.

In 1978, the firm filed for bankruptcy and the nautical division was sold to the American firm Honeywell and renamed to 'Honeywell-ELAC'. The nautical side of the business would be sold again to L3 Technologies in 1998, Wärtsilä in 2015, and Cohort PLC in 2019.

In 2016, ELAC acquired the American audio company Audio Alchemy.
