= Digital storage oscilloscope =

Oscilloscope that stores and analyses signals digitally

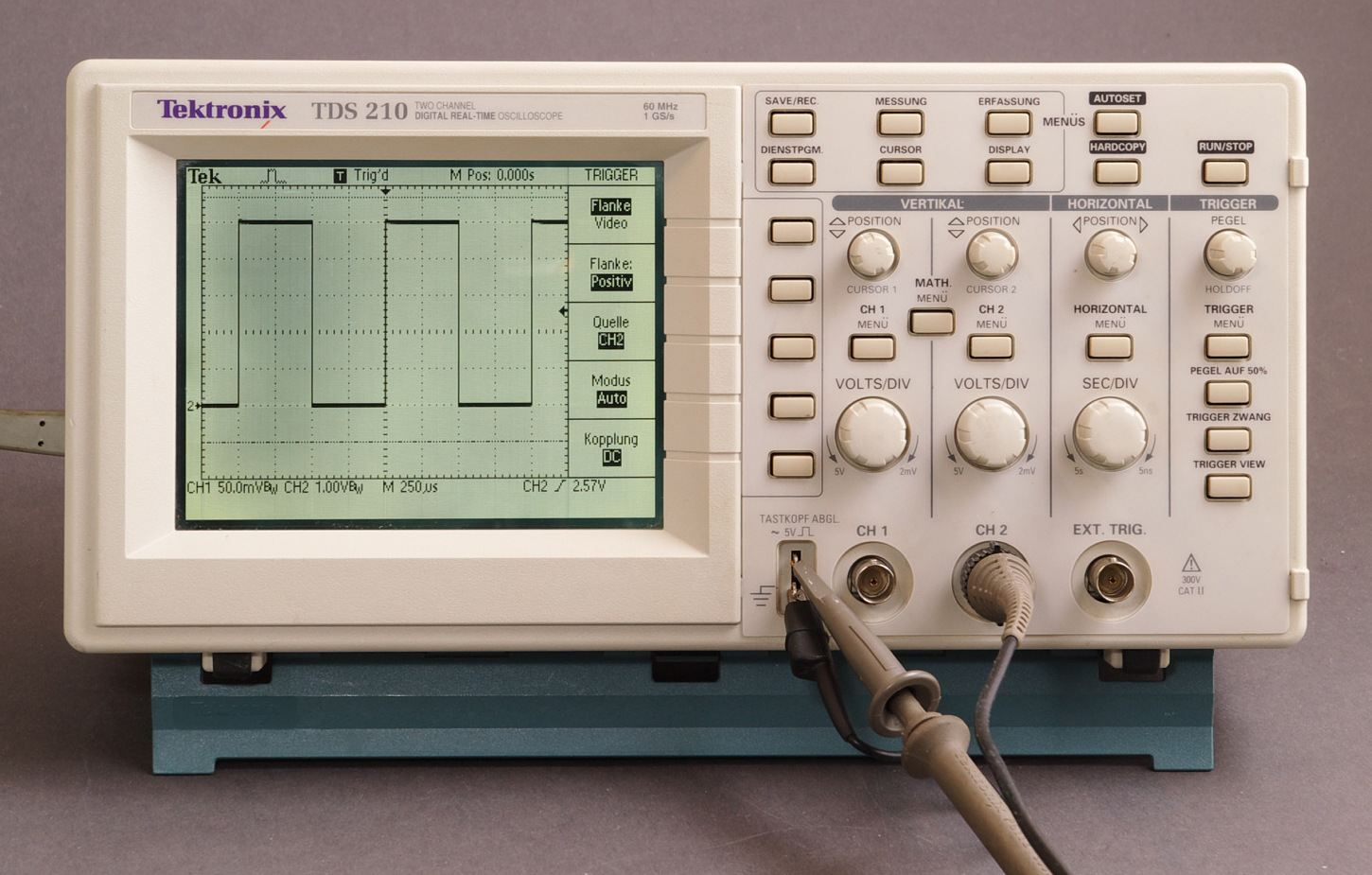
A Tektronix TDS210 digital oscilloscope

A digital storage oscilloscope (DSO) is an oscilloscope which stores and analyses the input signal digitally rather than using analog techniques. It is now the most common type of oscilloscope in use because of the advanced trigger, storage, display and measurement features which it typically provides.

The input analogue signal is sampled and then converted into a digital record of the amplitude of the signal at each sample time. The sampling frequency should be not less than the Nyquist rate to avoid aliasing. These digital values are then turned back into an analogue signal for display on a cathode ray tube (CRT), or transformed as needed for the various possible types of output—liquid crystal display, chart recorder, plotter or network interface.

Digital storage oscilloscope costs vary widely; bench-top self-contained instruments (complete with displays) start at US$300 or even less, with high-performance models selling for tens of thousands of dollars. Small, pocket-size models, limited in function, may retail for as little as US$50.

== Comparison with analog storage ==
The principal advantage over analog storage is that the stored traces are as bright, as sharply defined, and written as quickly as non-stored traces. Traces can be stored indefinitely or written out to some external data storage device and reloaded. This allows, for example, comparison of an acquired trace from a system under test with a standard trace acquired from a known-good system. Many models can display the waveform prior to the trigger signal.

Digital oscilloscopes usually analyze waveforms and provide numerical values as well as visual displays. These values typically include averages, maxima and minima, root mean square (RMS) and frequencies. They may be used to capture transient signals when operated in a single sweep mode, without the brightness and writing speed limitations of an analog storage oscilloscope.

The displayed trace can be manipulated after acquisition; a portion of the display can be magnified to make fine detail more visible, or a long trace can be examined in a single display to identify areas of interest. Many instruments allow a stored trace to be annotated by the user.

Most modern digital oscilloscopes use LCD panels as display.

Digital storage oscilloscopes may include interfaces such as a parallel printer port, RS-232 serial port, IEEE-488 bus, USB port, or Ethernet, allowing remote or automatic control and transfer of captured waveforms to external display or storage.

== PC based ==
A personal computer-based digital oscilloscope relies on a PC for user interface and display. The "front end" circuits, consisting of input amplifiers and analog to digital converters, are packaged separately and communicate with the PC over USB, Ethernet, or other interfaces. In one format, the "front end" is assembled on a plug-in expansion card that plugs into the computer backplane. PC based oscilloscopes may be less costly than an equivalent self-contained instrument as they can use the memory, display and keyboard of the attached PC. Displays may be larger, and acquired data can be easily transferred to PC hosted application software such as spread sheets. However, the interface to the host PC may limit the maximum data rate for acquisition, and the host PC may produce sufficient electromagnetic noise to interfere with measurements.
