= Digital signal (signal processing) =

Signal with discrete values in time and amplitude

The red digital signal is the sampled and quantized representation of the gray analog signal. A digital signal consists of a sequence of samples, which in this case are integers: 4, 5, 4, 3, 4, 6...

In the context of digital signal processing (DSP), a digital signal is a discrete time, quantized amplitude signal. In other words, it is a sampled signal consisting of samples that take on values from a discrete set (a countable set that can be mapped one-to-one to a subset of integers). If that discrete set is finite, the discrete values can be represented with digital words of a finite width. Most commonly, these discrete values are represented as fixed-point words (either proportional to the waveform values or companded) or floating-point words.

Discrete cosine waveform with a frequency of 50 Hz and a sampling rate of 1000 samples/sec, efficiently satisfying the sampling theorem for the reconstruction of the original cosine function from samples. (The effects of quantization are too subtle to be seen in this graph.)

The process of analog-to-digital conversion produces a digital signal. The conversion process can be thought of as occurring in two steps:

1. sampling, which produces a continuous-valued discrete-time signal, and
2. quantization, which replaces each sample value with an approximation selected from a given discrete set (for example, by truncating or rounding).

An analog signal can be reconstructed after conversion to digital (down to the precision afforded by the quantization used), provided that the signal has negligible power in frequencies above the Nyquist limit and does not saturate the quantizer.

Common practical digital signals are represented as 8-bit (256 levels), 16-bit (65,536 levels), 24-bit (16.8 million levels), and 32-bit (4.3 billion levels) using pulse-code modulation where the number of quantization levels is not necessarily limited to powers of two. A floating point representation is used in many DSP applications.
