= LightJet =

Brand of photographic printing hardware

LightJet is a brand of hardware used for photographic printing of digital images to photographic paper and film. LightJet printers are no longer manufactured but are however remanufactured and resold; and their lasers are still manufactured; and there are all parts at service company in Israel. LightJet produces significantly higher-quality results than most common inkjet printers available today. However, performing the task is not as convenient or easy as with inkjet. LightJet requires a developing machine with chemical materials and densitometry equipment LightJet is a trademark of Océ Display Graphics Systems, a division of Océ N.V. (the company that acquired Cymbolic Sciences, Inc.) In 2010 Océ was acquired by Canon of Japan. The term "LightJet" is often used to generically describe a digitally made chromogenic print. Competing manufactures of equipment include ZBE Chromira and Durst Lambda. They may be used in Minilabs.

== Details ==
Unexposed silver-halide (AgX) photographic paper is temporarily fixed on a stationary internal drum, where three digitally controlled lasers simultaneously expose the photo-sensitive emulsion on the paper medium (or back-lit transparency medium) with red, green and blue laser light. The amount of light from each laser varies to provide specific color and density values for each pixel imaged to the print. The light-path includes a spinning surface coated mirror mounted on an air-bearing that travels along the axis of the internal drum, thus reflecting the laser light at 90 degrees allowing for a dimensionally consistent round imaging dot across the entire area of the photographic paper. The purpose of this round imaging dot is to maintain edge to edge sharpness on the final print. The print is then processed using traditional photochemical means (usually RA4). After which the photographic print is handled just as any other photo-print.

Whereas xerography and inkjet printing employ a halftone process and ink to reproduce digital images on paper, digital-C is a photographic continuous tone process rather than halftone or error diffusion which are common on offset press or ink-jet. The device natively supports 24-bit RGB raster files, and is capable printing vector based files when fronted by a photographic Raster Image Processor (RIP). 24 bit color continuous-tone devices use large multitudes of colors, up to 16,777,216, rather than the small number of colors available to 4-color press and 8-color ink-jet type devices. Therefore, posterization and banding are unlikely from these types of prints when provided with a file of good integrity. Due to slight halation of the light source, digital C-prints produced on high end equipment have true continuous tones not possible with images created with ink or pigments (due to CMYK halftone limitations).

LightJet printers and film recorders are used by a number of professional-level photographic printing firms. Most deliver a final product printed on Fujifilm Crystal Archive or Kodak Endura paper in sizes up to at least 4×10 feet. Other silver-halide based materials can also be printed on laser driven devices such as the LightJet. The LightJet printers were manufactured in Vancouver, BC, Canada; the core internal drum technology was developed by Dan Gelbart at MacDonald Dettwiler & Associates (MDA) in the 1980s, and later refined by Cymbolic Sciences. Key individuals responsible for the success of LightJet series include Dale Benjamin, Tim Crandall, Rolf Dekleer, Dave Fraser, Robert Heath, Alex Holowko, Larry Kiser, Miranda Clegg, Chris Lynn, Wenny Macura, Derek Montgomery, Dan Murray, Karen Neufeld, Didier Primat, Alastair Reed, Jeff Rittichier, Horst Schaaf, Ken Smith, and Dan Whittle.

The original LightJet image recorder was introduced at PMA in 1995. The first version of the product was the LightJet2000, a three-laser continuous-tone film recorder (the selling price was US$195,000). Its maximum image size was 11×14 inches. The LightJet2000 largely replaced the Fire1000 film recorder.

The LightJet5000 large-format printer was introduced at PMA in 1996. The product produced continuous-tone photographic prints and Duratrans up to 50×50 inches. In 1997 a version capable of printing to a dimensional size limit of 50×100 inches was introduced.

The Océ LightJet430 50" x 120" (image size) photo laser printer was introduced in 2000. The 76" x 120" (image size) Océ LightJet500XL printer was introduced in 2002.

== See also ==
- Chromogenic
- Chromogenic print
- Photograph
