= Whipple's index =

Metric for tendency to misreport one's own age

Whipple's index (or index of concentration), invented by American demographer George Chandler Whipple (1866–1924), is a method to measure the tendency for individuals to inaccurately report their actual age or date of birth. Respondents to a census or other survey sometimes report their age or date of birth as a round number (typically ending in 0 and 5), or to be more culturally favorable, for example, so that they appear younger or to have been born on a date considered luckier than their actual date of birth. The process of reporting a rounded or “lucky” age is known as age-heaping.

== Calculation ==
The index score is obtained by summing the number of persons in the age range 23 and 62 inclusive, who report ages ending in 0 and 5, dividing that sum by the total population between ages 23 and 62 years inclusive, and multiplying the result by 5. Restated as a percentage, index scores range between 100 (no preference for ages ending in 0 and 5) and 500 (all people reporting ages ending in 0 and 5).

The UN recommends a standard for measuring the age heaping using Whipple's Index as follows:

Whipple's index	Quality of data	Deviation from perfect
< 105	Highly accurate	< 5%
105–109.9	Fairly accurate	5–9.99%
110–124.9	Approximate	10–24.99%
125–174.9	Rough	25–74.99%
> 175	Very rough	≥ 75%

== Applicability ==
Although Whipple's index has been widely applied to test for age heaping, it assumes that the heaping is most likely to occur in 5 and 10 year intervals or some other fixed interval based on digit preference or rounding. While other measures of age heaping, such as Myers' Blended Index, can be applied to find preferences for any terminal digit, the patterns of heaping may be complex.

For example, it has been shown that among Han Chinese, age heaping occurs on a 12-year cycle, consistent with preferred animal years of the Chinese calendar. Whether this heaping represents actual fertility behavior (e.g., bearing children in favorable animal years) or selective memory or reporting of year of birth has not been determined. Although the heaping is not severe among Han, and it does not seem to be associated with age exaggeration, it is systematic and is higher among illiterate populations. On the other hand, among Turkic Muslim populations in China (Uyghurs and Kazakhs in Xinjiang Province) there is severe heaping at ages ending in 0 and 5; it is much higher among illiterate populations and appears to be correlated with age exaggeration. These traditionally Muslim nationalities do not use the Chinese calendar.

This finding suggests that use of Whipple's Index or other measures of age heaping that focus on specific digits or on decimal intervals of the age spikes may not be appropriate for all populations. In the case of China's 1990 census reported above, among Han heaping was found at ages 38, 50, 62, 74, and so on — ages that corresponded with being born in the Year of the Dragon. But among Turkic Muslims, heaping was found at ages 35, 40, 45, 50, 55, 60, and so on and increased in magnitude with age.

=== ABCC Index ===
ABCC Index is another age heaping index that is used in a research and is based on the Whipple's Index. This method was developed by A’Hearn, Baten, and Crayen. Who examined a close relationship between age heaping and a number of human capital indicators from the U.S. census sample namely, the race, gender, high and low educational status. Results proved a statistically significant relationship. Further, the same method was conducted on the data from 17 different European countries starting from the Middle Ages up until 19th century. The outcome has also depicted a positive correlation between age heaping and literacy. Moreover, another study that took into consideration Latin America from the 17th to 20th century also illustrated the higher tendency to age heaping among illiterate population.

==== Data Selection ====
When applying ABCC index it is important to check the quality of the data and examine the institutional framework as well as the data selection process. One of the major rules is to consider only people above 23 and below 62, in order to prevent distortions effects. The justification is that the age awareness increases when the minimal age requirements applies (e.g. marriage registration, military conscripts, voting) whereas, older people often tend to overstate their age. Moreover, there are different forms of age heaping, e.g. to two or to twelve. Heaping to two is more common among adults, teenagers and children.

==== Application ====
The method is often used to explore inequality of numeracy for certain populations or regions. ABCC index helps to measure differences in human capital for further analysis. For instance, to evaluate the gap between numeracy levels of the upper and the lower segments of a sample population, taken from different countries (e.g. 26 regions of France, 25 states of the USA). This inequality of human capital might in turn exerts in further studies a negative or positive relationship on subsequent economic development of selected countries.
