= Atkinson dithering =

Image dithering algorithm by Bill Atkinson

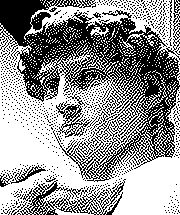
A 1-bit image of the Statue of David, dithered with the Atkinson algorithm

Atkinson dithering is a variant of Floyd–Steinberg dithering designed by Bill Atkinson at Apple Computer, and used in the original Macintosh computer.

== Implementation ==
The algorithm achieves dithering using error diffusion, meaning it pushes (adds) the residual quantization error of a pixel onto its neighboring pixels, to be dealt with later. It spreads the debt out according to the distribution (shown as a map of the neighboring pixels):

$$\begin{bmatrix}
&  & *  & \frac{\displaystyle 1}{\displaystyle 8} & \frac{\displaystyle 1}{\displaystyle 8} \\
\ldots & \frac{\displaystyle 1}{\displaystyle 8} & \frac{\displaystyle 1}{\displaystyle 8} & \frac{\displaystyle 1}{\displaystyle 8} & \ldots \\
\ldots &  & \frac{\displaystyle 1}{\displaystyle 8} &  & \ldots \\
\end{bmatrix}$$

The pixel indicated with a star (*) indicates the pixel currently being scanned, and the blank pixels are the previously scanned pixels. The algorithm scans the image top-to-bottom, left-to-right (i.e. in row-major order), quantizing pixel values one by one. Each time the quantization error is transferred to the neighboring pixels, while not affecting the pixels that already have been quantized. Hence, if a number of pixels have been rounded downwards, it becomes more likely that the next pixel is rounded upwards, such that on average, the quantization error is reduced.

Unlike Floyd–Steinberg dithering, only 3/4 of the error is diffused outward. This leads to a more localized dither, at the cost of lower performance on near-white and near-black areas, but the increase in contrast on those areas may be regarded as more visually desirable for some purposes.

== See also ==
- Ditherpunk
