= Critters for Sale =

2021 video game

Critters For Sale
- Steam header art
- Developer: Sonoshee
- Publisher: Sonoshee
- Engine: Unity
- Platforms: Windows, Linux
- Release: 3 June 2021
- Genre: Adventure
- Mode: Single-player

Critters For Sale is a 2021 adventure video game by Moroccan independent developer Sonoshee. Described as "a hybrid between (a) point and click adventure and visual novel", the game is an episodic collection of five short stories unified by themes including "time travel, black magic and immortality".

== Plot ==
Critters For Sale is a compilation of five non-linear short stories, set in different eras and locations: Snake, Goat, Monkey, Dragon, and Spider. Although the stories are largely self-contained, each allude to a broader and overarching cosmological conflict between the celestial Paradise Architects and the Devil-like Noid Men. In the first episode, Snake, the player is Sergei Volkov, a man from the year 2033 receiving a cryptic message inviting him to the Limelight Club, a place with ties to aliens, secret societies, alternate timelines, and a doomsday machine. In other episodes, the player assumes identities as Jaafar, a wanderer seeking a treasurer in the desert in 972, Othman, a Moroccan teenager in 1991, and a patron of a mysterious casino in 1997. The subject matter is purposefully asynchronous and disjointed, for instance including real-world celebrities as characters in the game, such as musicians Michael Jackson and MC Ride (of Death Grips).

== Gameplay ==
A screenshot of Critters for Sale

Critters For Sale is a traditional point and click adventure game, in which the player follows the story by interacting with people for dialog or clicking on objects to receive information about the surrounding environment. Dialog in the game features choices that lead to different endings across episodes, with eighteen separate endings. Once playthroughs of an episode are completed, the player can fast forward through dialog in that episode to expedite repeat playthroughs. Although the game is essentially non-linear in structure, and any episode can be played in any order, the game requires certain episodes to be played before puzzles in other episodes are solvable. The game also offers occasional interactive puzzles and games secondary to the core gameplay, such as a casino that features memory games and reaction tests.

== Development ==
In January 2019, two episodes of an alpha build of Critters for Sale, Snake and Goat, were released as free downloads. The preview was received favorably, with Rachel Watts of PC Gamer praising the unusual atmosphere of the game, stating "if every other episode in the full game (is) as bonkers and surreal as the first, we're in for a wild ride". A demo of the first chapter of Critters For Sale, Snake, was previewed in January 2021, with the full game released for download on Steam and itch.io on 3 June 2021. A soundtrack of Critters For Sale by VRTLHVN, containing unreleased and bonus tracks, was also released on Bandcamp on 3 June 2021.

== Reception ==
Reception

Review scores
Publication	Score
Adventure Gamers	4/5
Indie Game Website	7.5

Reception of Critters For Sale was positive, with many critics remarking on the distinctively unusual and unclassifiable qualities of the game. Jesse G of Dread XP praised the game as "a piece of art unlike any you've experienced before", stating "to describe this game is to describe a fever dream". Adventure Gamers noted, however, that the game is "not simply bizarre - it's compelling, and while much of the story feels impossible to grasp on the surface, there's an ineffable quality to the imagery that resonates somewhere deeper, on an almost unconscious level." Pixel Die, who subsequently cited Critters for Sale as one of the "best surprises" of the year, stated the game had "one of the weirdest plots of any game this year", praising "how well-made and tightly packed in these outlandish ideas were brought to fruition".

The monochrome graphics of the game elicited differing responses from reviewers. Dread XP praised the "unbelievably great art style" for its "intricate collage of places and things that you've never experienced before". Alexis Ong of The Indie Game Website stated the game featured "one of the most striking visual experiences around", praising its "hypnotic animations and hyper-stylised full motion video-style snippets." Vulgar Knight stated "the visual approach is an acquired taste", noting "without any hotspots and lacking definition, it can be hard to see what's going on." Save or Quit noted that the game "opens with an epilepsy warning for good reason, although this art style does seem to make the violence and gore feel sanitised".

Critics were divided on the merits of the game's narrative as an expression of a coherent plot. Joel Couture of Indie Games Plus observed the game was not "meaningless", but contained a "vastness to its complexity that is downright overwhelming". Writing for The Indie Game Website, Alexis Ong stated "There are no real revelations or complicated plot twists, only encounters with a galactic assortment of freaks and weirdos. If you’re looking for deep lore and heady chunks of exposition, this is not for you." Kain Klaren of Klardendum stated "the plot doesn't really matter, as it's more of a collection of things that happen, even though there is a defined storyline going through the episodes. Either way, you’re here for the weird, not to analyze it." Save or Quit expressed boredom with the game's narrative, noting that "the game dabbles with classic science fiction and fantasy themes but skirts engaging with the concepts on a deeper level".

== See also ==
- Ditherpunk
