= Continuous tone image =

Image in which each point can transition smoothly between shades

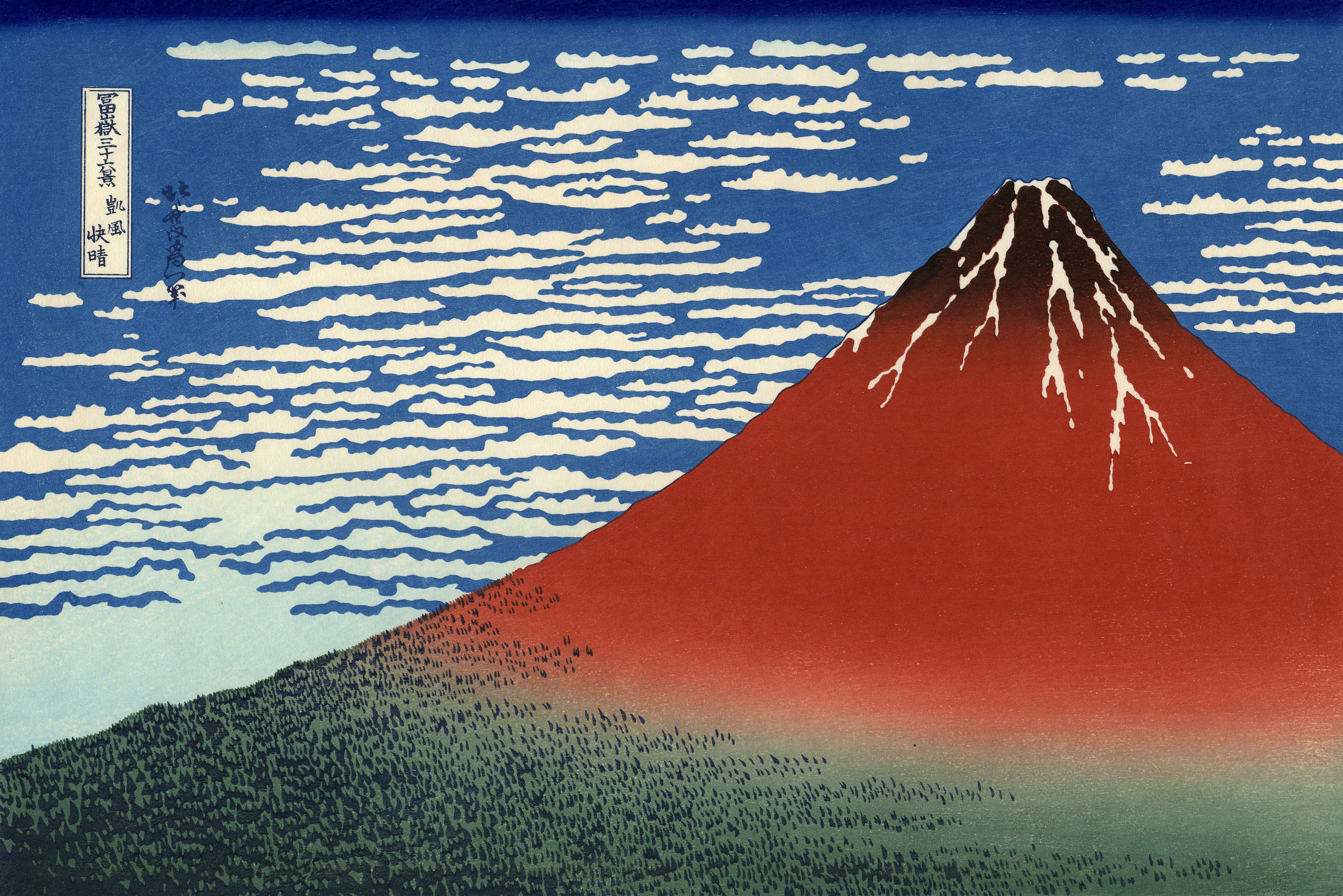
Fine Wind, Clear Morning, the second print in Hokusai's Thirty-six Views of Mount Fuji (20th century reprint). Wood block prints like this are an example of a continuous-tone image.

A continuous-tone image is one in which each color at any point in the image can transition smoothly between shades, rather than being represented by discrete elements such as halftones or pixels.

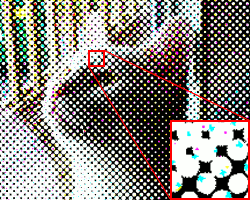
Many printing methods use discrete halftone dots of cyan, magenta, yellow, and black (CMYK). Although halftone images are not continuously toned, they can appear continuous with high enough resolution or when viewed from a far enough distance.

Examples of continuous-tone images are natural phenomena, images produced with dye-based processes, images produced with certain analog printmaking processes (intaglio, block printing, stone lithography), and paintings. Halftone prints (as produced with inkjet and offset printers), traditional film, and digital screens are not truly continuous-tone since they rely on discrete elements (halftones, grains, or pixels) to create an image. However, the term applies when the appearance is so smooth that the breaks or gaps between tonal values are imperceptible.

TV, computer and phone displays are effectively continuous. Purely analog video signals can provide infinite tone variations according to their gamut.

== See also ==
- Halftone
- Chromogenic print
- LightJet
