= Floyd–Steinberg dithering =

Image dithering algorithm

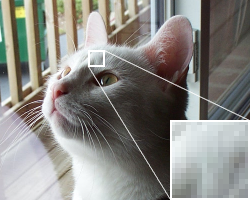
Original picture

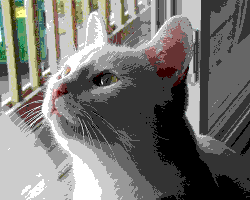
No dithering

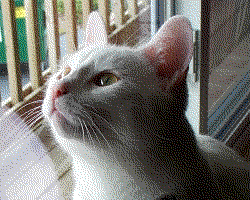
Floyd–Steinberg dithering

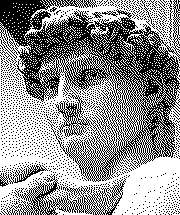
A 1-bit image of the Statue of David, dithered with Floyd–Steinberg algorithm

Floyd–Steinberg dithering is an image dithering algorithm first published in 1976 by Robert W. Floyd and Louis Steinberg. It is commonly used by image manipulation software, for example, when converting an image from a Truecolor 24-bit PNG format into a GIF format, which is restricted to a maximum of 256 colors.

== Implementation ==
The algorithm achieves dithering using error diffusion, meaning it pushes (adds) the residual quantization error of a pixel onto its neighboring pixels, to be quantized after. It spreads the debt out according to the distribution (shown as a map of the neighboring pixels):

$$\begin{bmatrix}
&                                          & *                                        & \frac{\displaystyle 7}{\displaystyle 16} & \ldots \\
\ldots & \frac{\displaystyle 3}{\displaystyle 16} & \frac{\displaystyle 5}{\displaystyle 16} & \frac{\displaystyle 1}{\displaystyle 16} & \ldots \\
\end{bmatrix}$$

The pixel indicated with a star (*) indicates the pixel currently being scanned, and the blank pixels are the previously scanned pixels. The specific values (7/16, 3/16, 5/16, 1/16) were originally found by trial-and-error, "guided by the desire to have a region of desired density 0.5 come out as a checkerboard pattern". The algorithm scans the image from left to right, top to bottom, quantizing pixel values one by one. Each time, the quantization error is transferred to the neighboring pixels, while not affecting the pixels that already have been quantized. Hence, if a number of pixels have been rounded downwards, it becomes more likely that the next pixel is rounded upwards, such that on average, the quantization error is close to zero.

The diffusion coefficients have the property that if the original pixel values are exactly halfway in between the nearest available colors, the dithered result is a checkerboard pattern. For example, 50% grey data could be dithered as a black-and-white checkerboard pattern. For optimal dithering, the counting of quantization errors should be in sufficient accuracy to prevent rounding errors from affecting the result.

For correct results, all values should be linearized first, rather than operating directly on sRGB values as is common for images stored on computers.

In some implementations, the horizontal direction of scan alternates between lines; this is called "serpentine scanning" or boustrophedon transform dithering.

== See also ==
- Atkinson dithering
