= Bill Atkinson =

American computer engineer, programmer and photographer (1951–2025)

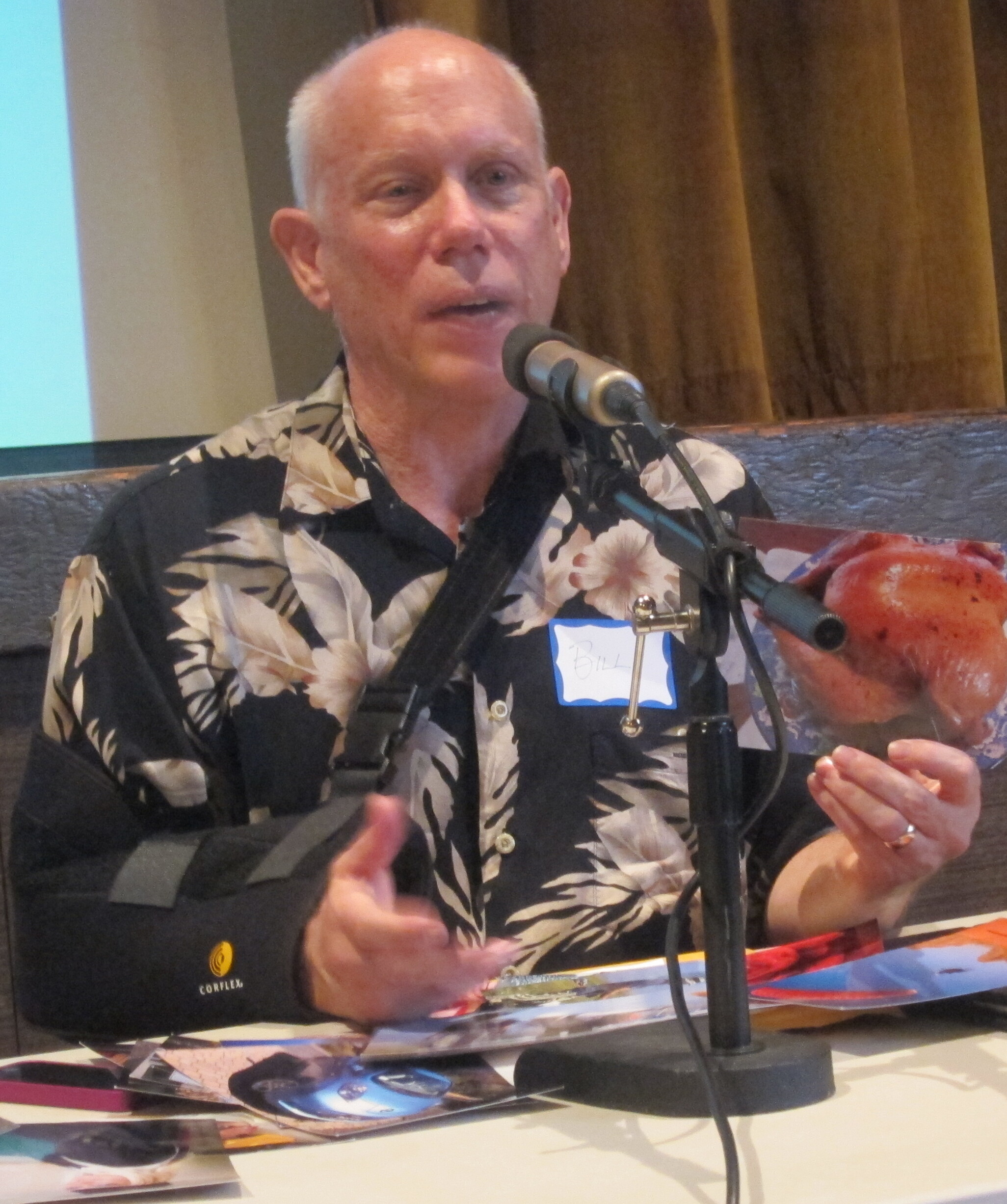
- Atkinson in 2012
- Born: William Dana Atkinson; March 17, 1951; Ottumwa, Iowa, U.S.
- Died: June 5, 2025 (aged 74); Portola Valley, California, U.S.
- Education: UC San Diego; University of Washington
- Occupations: Engineer; inventor; nature photographer
- Known for: Apple Lisa; Macintosh 128K; QuickDraw; HyperCard
- Website: billatkinson.com

William Dana Atkinson (March 17, 1951 – June 5, 2025) was an American computer engineer, computer programmer and photographer. Atkinson worked at Apple Computer from 1978 to 1990. Some of Atkinson's noteworthy contributions to the field of computing include Macintosh QuickDraw and Lisa LisaGraf (Atkinson independently discovered the midpoint circle algorithm for fast drawing of circles by using the sum of consecutive odd numbers), regions, marching ants, the menu bar, the selection lasso, MacPaint (FatBits), HyperCard, Atkinson dithering, and the PhotoCard application program.

== Early life and education ==
Atkinson was born in Ottumwa, Iowa, on March 17, 1951. He grew up in Los Gatos, California, the third child of seven born to anesthesiologist John Atkinson and obstetrician Ethel Dana Atkinson. He had two brothers and four sisters. He received his undergraduate degree from the University of California, San Diego, where Jef Raskin, who would go on to develop the Apple Macintosh, was one of his professors. Atkinson continued his studies as a graduate student in neurochemistry at the University of Washington.

== Apple ==
Raskin invited Atkinson to visit him at Apple Computer; Steve Jobs persuaded him to join the company immediately as employee No. 51, and Atkinson never finished his PhD. Atkinson was the principal designer and developer of the graphical user interface (GUI) of the Apple Lisa and, later, one of the first thirty members of the original Apple Macintosh development team, and was the creator of the MacPaint application. He also designed and implemented QuickDraw, the fundamental toolbox that the Lisa and Macintosh used for graphics. QuickDraw's performance was essential for the success of the Macintosh GUI. He also was one of the main designers of the Lisa and Macintosh user interfaces. Atkinson also conceived, designed and implemented HyperCard, an early and influential hypermedia system. HyperCard put the power of computer programming and database design into the hands of non-programmers. In 1994, Atkinson received the EFF Pioneer Award for his contributions.

== Career after Apple ==
In 1990, Atkinson and two others co-founded Apple spin-off General Magic. Byte magazine wrote:

The obstacles to General Magic's success may appear daunting, but General Magic is not your typical start-up company. Its partners include some of the biggest players in the worlds of computing, communications, and consumer electronics, and it's loaded with top-notch engineers who have been given a clean slate to reinvent traditional approaches to ubiquitous worldwide communications.

In 2007, Atkinson began working as an outside developer with Numenta, a startup working on computer intelligence. On his work there Atkinson said, "what Numenta is doing is more fundamentally important to society than the personal computer and the rise of the Internet."

== Photography ==
Atkinson later worked as a nature photographer, focusing on close-up photographs of stones that had been cut and polished. His 2004 book Within the Stone features a collection of his close-up photographs. The detailed images he created were made possible by the accuracy and creative control of the digital printing process that he helped create. He developed a mobile app called PhotoCard that would allow users to take digital images and make postcards with personal messages that could then be printed and sent via postal service or over email.

== Psychedelic activism ==
Atkinson was a devoted advocate for the use of 5-MeO-DMT, an inhalable short-acting psychedelic drug. He personally used the drug hundreds of times between 2012 and his 2025 death. He helped to create and refine a pen-shaped vaporizer that made low, controlled doses of the drug possible and easy; previously, it had been typically vaporized in a pipe from a solid form, with frequently unreliable dosing that led to unpredictable effects on the user. He gave away up to a thousand such vape-pens in an effort to spread the use of low-dose 5-MeO-DMT among therapists and practitioners. He also anonymously wrote and updated a detailed guide on how to create such vape-pens, and published it on the popular Erowid drug-nerd website.

== Personal life and death ==
Atkinson was married three times and had two daughters, a stepson, and a stepdaughter. He died from pancreatic cancer in Portola Valley, California, on June 5, 2025, at the age of 74.

== In popular culture ==
Actor Nelson Franklin portrayed him in the 2013 film Jobs that covered the early days of Apple under Steve Jobs. The film had drawn criticism for its take on the environment at the company. Atkinson's co-worker Bill Fernandez did not see the film, saying "It seems to me that there's a lot of fan fiction about Apple Computer and about Steve Jobs, and I think that this is the biggest, flashiest piece of fan fiction that there's been to date."
