= List of sensors =

This is a list of sensors sorted by sensor type.

== Acoustic, sound, vibration ==
- Acoustic radiometer
- Geophone
- Hydrophone
- Microphone
- Pickup
- Seismometer
- Sound locator

== Automotive ==
- Air flow meter
- Air–fuel ratio meter
- Blind spot monitor
- Crankshaft position sensor (CKP)
- Curb feeler
- Defect detector
- Engine coolant temperature sensor
- Hall-effect sensor
- Wheel speed sensor
- Airbag sensors
- Automatic transmission speed sensor
- Brake fluid pressure sensor
- Camshaft position sensor (CMP)
- Cylinder Head Temperature gauge
- Engine crankcase pressure sensor
- Exhaust gas temperature sensor
- Fuel level sensor
- Fuel pressure sensor
- Knock sensor
- Light sensor
- MAP sensor
- Mass airflow sensor (MAF)
- Oil level sensor
- Oil pressure sensor
- Omniview technology
- Oxygen sensor (O_{2})
- Parking sensor
- Radar gun
- Radar sensor
- Speed sensor
- Throttle position sensor
- Tire pressure sensor
- Torque sensor
- Transmission fluid temperature sensor
- Turbine speed sensor
- Variable reluctance sensor
- Vehicle speed sensor
- Water-in-fuel sensor
- Wheel speed sensor
- ABS sensors

== Chemical ==
- Breathalyzer
- Carbon dioxide sensor
- Carbon monoxide detector
- Catalytic bead sensor
- Chemical field-effect transistor
- Chemiresistor
- Electrochemical gas sensor
- Electronic nose
- Electrolyte–insulator–semiconductor sensor
- Energy-dispersive X-ray spectroscopy
- Fluorescent chloride sensors
- Holographic sensor
- Hydrocarbon dew point analyzer
- Hydrogen sensor
- Hydrogen sulfide sensor
- Infrared point sensor
- Ion-selective electrode
- ISFET
- Nondispersive infrared sensor
- Nose
- Microwave chemistry sensor
- Morphix Chameleon
- Nitrogen oxide sensor
- Nondispersive infrared sensor
- Olfactometer
- Optode
- Oxygen sensor
- Ozone monitor
- Pellistor
- pH glass electrode
- Potentiometric sensor
- Redox electrode
- Smoke detector
- Zinc oxide nanorod sensor

== Electric current, electric potential, magnetic, radio ==
- Current sensor
- Daly detector
- Electroscope
- Electron multiplier
- Faraday cup
- Galvanometer
- Hall-effect sensor
- Hall probe
- Magnetic anomaly detector
- Magnetometer
- Magnetoresistance
- MEMS magnetic field sensor
- Metal detector
- Planar Hall sensor
- Radio direction finder
- Test light
- Voltage detector

== Environment, weather, moisture, humidity ==
- Actinometer
- Air pollution sensor
- Bedwetting alarm
- Ceilometer
- Dew warning
- Electrochemical gas sensor
- Fish counter
- Frequency domain sensor
- Gas detector
- Hook gauge evaporimeter
- Humistor
- Hygrometer
- Leaf sensor
- Lysimeter
- Pyranometer
- Pyrgeometer
- Psychrometer
- Rain gauge
- Rain sensor
- Seismometer
- SNOTEL
- Snow gauge
- Soil moisture sensor
- Stream gauge
- Tide gauge
- Weather radar

== Flow, fluid velocity ==
- Air flow meter
- Anemometer
- Flow sensor
- Gas meter
- Mass flow sensor
- Water meter

== Ionizing radiation, subatomic particles ==
- Bubble chamber
- Cloud chamber
- Geiger counter
- Geiger–Müller tube
- Ionization chamber
- Gaseous ionization detectors
- Neutron detection
- Particle detector
- Proportional counter
- Scintillator
- Scintillation counter
- Semiconductor detector
- Thermoluminescent dosimeter
- Wire chamber

== Navigation instruments ==
- Airspeed indicator
- Altimeter
- Attitude indicator
- Depth gauge
- Fluxgate compass
- Gyroscope
- Inertial navigation system
- Inertial reference unit
- Machmeter
- Magnetic compass
- MHD sensor
- Ring laser gyroscope
- Sextant
- Turn coordinator
- Variometer
- Vibrating structure gyroscope
- Yaw-rate sensor

== Position, angle, displacement, distance, speed, acceleration ==
- Accelerometer
- Auxanometer
- Capacitive displacement sensor
- Capacitive sensing
- Displacement sensor (general article)
- Flex sensor
- Free fall sensor
- Gravimeter
- Gyroscopic sensor
- Impact sensor
- Inclinometer
- Incremental encoder
- Integrated circuit piezoelectric sensor
- Laser rangefinder
- Laser surface velocimeter
- LIDAR
- Linear encoder
- Linear variable differential transformer (LVDT)
- Liquid capacitive inclinometers
- Odometer
- Photoelectric sensor
- Piezoelectric accelerometer
- Position sensor
- Position sensitive device
- Angular rate sensor
- Rotary encoder
- Rotary variable differential transformer
- Selsyn
- Shock detector
- Shock data logger
- Sudden Motion Sensor
- Tilt sensor
- Tachometer
- Ultrasonic thickness gauge
- Ultra-wideband radar
- Variable reluctance sensor
- Velocity receiver
- Magnetic sensor

== Optical, light, imaging, photon ==
- Charge-coupled device
- CMOS sensor
- Angle–sensitive pixel
- Colorimeter
- Contact image sensor
- Electro-optical sensor
- Flame detector
- Infra-red sensor
- Kinetic inductance detector
- LED as light sensor
- Light-addressable potentiometric sensor
- Nichols radiometer
- Fiber optic sensors
- Optical position sensor
- Thermopile laser sensors
- Photodetector
- Photodiode
- Photomultiplier
- Photomultiplier tube
- Phototransistor
- Photoelectric sensor
- Photoionization detector
- Photomultiplier
- Photoresistor
- Photoswitch
- Phototube
- Scintillometer
- Shack–Hartmann wavefront sensor
- Single-photon avalanche diode
- Superconducting nanowire single-photon detector
- Transition-edge sensor
- Visible Light Photon Counter
- Wavefront sensor

== Pressure ==
- Barograph
- Barometer
- Boost gauge
- Bourdon gauge
- Hot filament ionization gauge
- Ionization gauge
- McLeod gauge
- Oscillating U-tube
- Permanent downhole gauge
- Piezometer
- Pirani gauge
- Pressure sensor
- Pressure gauge
- Tactile sensor
- Time pressure gauge

== Force, density, level ==
- Bhangmeter
- Hydrometer
- Force gauge and Force Sensor
- Level sensor
- Load cell
- Magnetic level gauge
- Nuclear density gauge
- Piezocapacitive pressure sensor
- Piezoelectric sensor
- Strain gauge
- Torque sensor
- Viscometer

== Thermal, heat, temperature ==
- Bolometer
- Bimetallic strip
- Calorimeter
- Exhaust gas temperature gauge
- Flame detection
- Gardon gauge
- Golay cell
- Heat flux sensor
- Infrared thermometer
- Microbolometer
- Microwave radiometer
- Net radiometer
- Quartz thermometer
- Resistance thermometer
- Silicon bandgap temperature sensor
- Special sensor microwave/imager
- Temperature gauge
- Thermistor
- Thermocouple
- Thermometer
- Phosphor thermometry
- Pyrometer

== Proximity, presence ==
- Alarm sensor
- Doppler radar
- Motion detector
- Occupancy sensor
- Proximity sensor
- Passive infrared sensor
- Reed switch
- Stud finder
- Triangulation sensor
- Touch switch
- Wired glove

== Sensor technology ==
- Active pixel sensor
- Back-illuminated sensor
- BioFET
- Biochip
- Biosensor
- Capacitance probe
- Capacitive sensing
- Catadioptric sensor
- Carbon paste electrode
- Digital sensors
- Displacement receiver
- Electromechanical film
- Electro-optical sensor
- Electrochemical fatigue crack sensor
- Fabry–Pérot interferometer
- Fiber Bragg grating
- Fisheries acoustics
- Image sensor
- Image sensor format
- Inductive sensor
- Intelligent sensor
- Lab-on-a-chip
- Leaf sensor
- Machine vision
- Microelectromechanical systems
- MOSFET
- Photoelasticity
- Quantum sensor
- Radar
  - Ground-penetrating radar
  - Synthetic aperture radar
  - Radar tracker
- Stretch sensor
- Sensor array
- Sensor fusion
- Sensor grid
- Sensor node
- Soft sensor
- Sonar
- Staring array
- Tapered element oscillating microbalance (TEOM)
- Transducer
- Ultrasonic sensor
- Video sensor
- Visual sensor network
- Wheatstone bridge
- Wireless sensor network
- Through-beam edge sensor

== Speed sensor ==
Speed sensors are machines used to detect the speed of an object, usually a transport vehicle. They include:

- Wheel speed sensors
- Speedometers
- Pitometer logs
- Pitot tubes
- Airspeed indicators
- Piezo sensors (e.g. in a road surface)
- LIDAR
- Ground speed radar
- Doppler radar
- ANPR (where vehicles are timed over a fixed distance)
- Laser surface velocimeters for moving surfaces
- Bicycle speed sensors

== Others ==
- Actigraphy
- Air pollution sensor
- Analog image processing
- Atomic force microscopy
- Atomic Gravitational Wave Interferometric Sensor
- Attitude control (spacecraft): Horizon sensor, Earth sensor, Moon sensor, Satellite Sensor, Sun sensor
- Catadioptric sensor
- Chemoreceptor
- Compressive sensing
- Cryogenic particle detectors
- Dew warning
- Diffusion tensor imaging
- Digital holography
- Electronic tongue
- Fine Guidance Sensor
- Flat panel detector
- Functional magnetic resonance imaging
- Glass break detector
- Heartbeat sensor
- Hyperspectral sensors
- IRIS (Biosensor), Interferometric Reflectance Imaging Sensor
- Laser beam profiler
- Littoral Airborne Sensor/Hyperspectral
- LORROS
- Millimeter wave scanner
- Magnetic resonance imaging
- Moire deflectometry
- Molecular sensor
- Nanosensor
- Nano-tetherball Sensor
- Omnidirectional camera
- Organoleptic sensors
- Optical coherence tomography
- Phase unwrapping techniques
- Polygraph Truth Detection
- Positron emission tomography
- Push broom scanner
- Quantization (signal processing)
- Range imaging
- Scanning SQUID microscope
- Single-Photon Emission Computed Tomography (SPECT)
- Smartdust
- SQUID, Superconducting quantum interference device
- SSIES, Special Sensors-Ions, Electrons, and Scintillation thermal plasma analysis package
- SSMIS, Special Sensor Microwave Imager / Sounder
- Structured-light 3D scanner
- Sun sensor, Attitude control (spacecraft)
- Superconducting nanowire single-photon detector
- Thin-film thickness monitor
- Time-of-flight camera
- TriDAR, Triangulation and LIDAR Automated Rendezvous and Docking
- Unattended Ground Sensors
