= Vibration calibrator =

Source of mechanical vibrations at known frequency and amplitude

A Vibration calibrator, sometimes called a reference shaker, is an instrument used to verify or calibrate sensors such as accelerometers, velocity receiver, and displacement transducers. They produce sinusoidal mechanical vibration signals with known amplitudes and frequencies. The vibrating part of the instrument is usually a cylindrical steel stud with an internal thread for attachment of the test object. An electrodynamic or piezoelectric actuator system is used to produce the vibrations. With older instruments it was necessary to adjust the vibration amplitude according to the weight of the test object. However, modern instruments contain a built-in reference accelerometer and closed-loop control, with which the amplitude is kept constant up to a maximum specified weight of test object. Older models can be used to calibrate objects weighing up to a maximum of approximately 100 g (3.5 oz), whereas the latest instruments can work stably with test objects weighing over 500 g (18 oz).

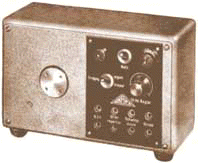
Vibration calibrator made around 1960

Vibration calibrators are most often used for testing and checking vibration sensors and measuring instruments at the site of their operation and are, therefore, usually transportable and battery operated.

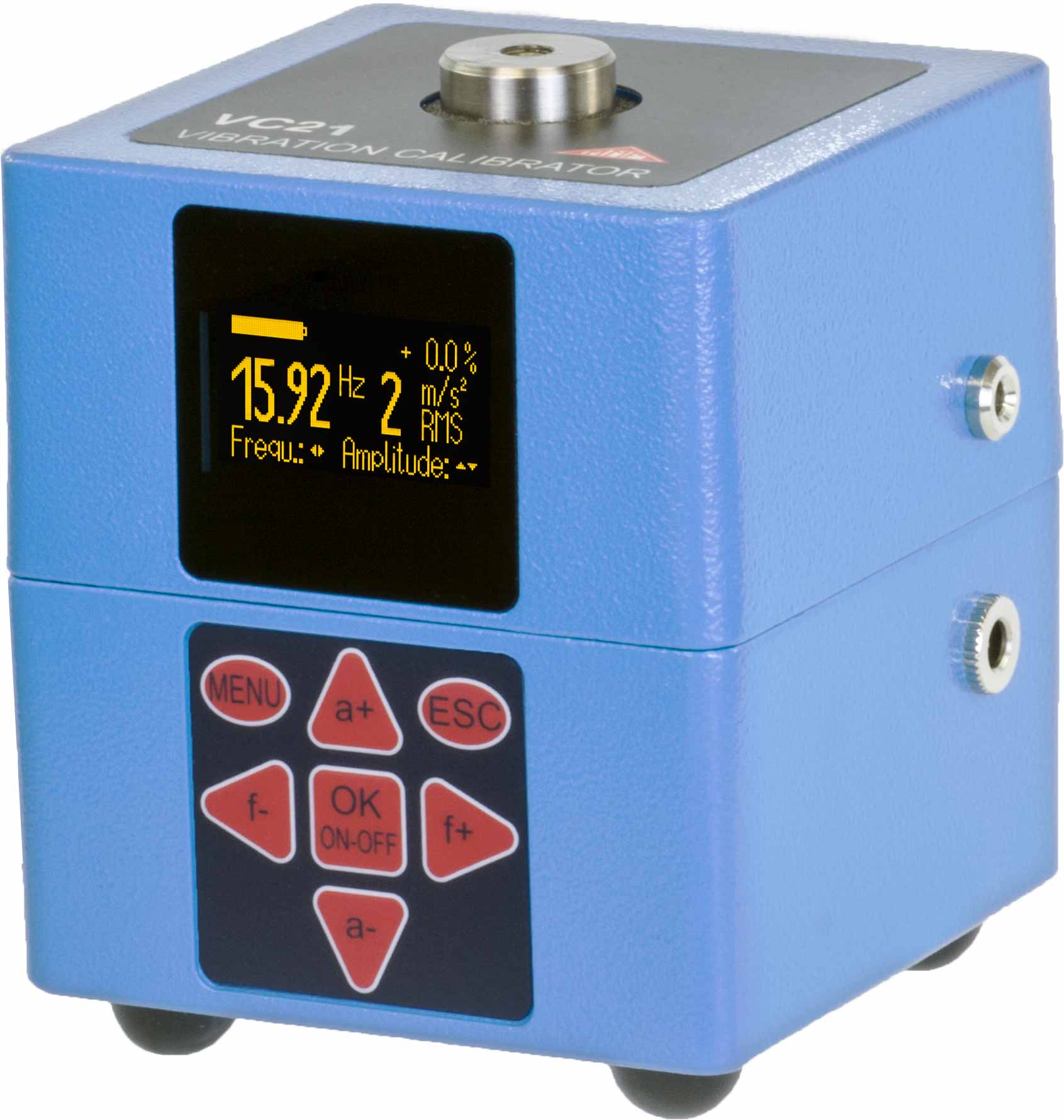
Modern vibration calibrator for frequencies between 16 and 1280 Hz

The most commonly occurring vibration frequency of calibrators is 159.2 Hz, which is equivalent to a radian frequency of 1000 rad/s. The vibration displacement, velocity and acceleration of sinusoidal signals are connected with each other through the factor of the radian frequency. Advantageously, at 1000 rad/s the numerical values of the amplitudes for all three vibration quantities are the same. For example, a vibration acceleration of 10 m/s² at 159.2 Hz is equivalent to a vibration velocity of 10 mm/s and a vibration displacement of 10 μm.

With some instruments it is possible to choose between several frequencies or to finely tune a specific frequency range. Frequencies between 16 Hz and 10 kHz are common on the market.

Occasionally, vibration calibrators also contain a signal conditioner for connection to various types of vibration sensors, and additionally a display for reading the sensitivity.

A procedure for the calibration of vibration calibrators is described in the international standard ISO 16063-44.
