= CRX10 =

- Manufacturer: CNRobot Co. Ltd.
- Year of creation: 2011

The CRX10 is an autonomous mobile robot platform for education, training and research that was developed by South Korean robotics company CNRobot. CRX10 supports MSRDS, SPL (Simple Programming Language), AVR (C languages) and Android programming languages. The CRX10 was unveiled in May 2011.

== Description ==
The robot dimension is 192x197x79.5 (LxWxH). CRX10 comes packaged with 7 IR floor sensors, 3 obstacle detection PSD sensors and 4 audio sensors. Robot communication is possible via cable (UART), Wi-Fi (Bluetooth) with GAP and SPP profile or dipole antenna with communication distance is more than 100 m. CRX10 supports TTL serial interface.

The CRX brain is based on Atmega128 and Atmega88 Dual Processor. The robot operates either with Lithium-ion battery and can be recharged regularly from a wall plug or 6 cells primary batteries. CRX10 can be controlled via Android-based smartphone. Robot has 4 buttons on the top of the CRX10's bumper that can be assigned to different custom-defined programs or actions.

Robot platform can be transformed from 4 wheels to 2 wheels drive, has double-wide wheels, 3 rubber ring-shaped coverings fit around each wheel rim to enable a close contact with the ground, wheel diameter is 64 mm. Robot speed is 1 meter per second.

Dot Matrix 8x8 on the top of CRX10 body can be used for displaying different graphic, emoticons or characters. The robot comes fully assembled and tested with 9 ready to use robot activities or services in VPL and educational materials for teachers.

CRX10 can carry objects using a detachable payload tray that may weigh about 10 kg.

== Accessories ==
- Remote Control allows the owner to control CRX10 remotely
- Detachable payload tray allows the owner to carry objects on robot or customize it with cameras, robotic arm and so on.
- Charger
- Camera (optional)

== Functions ==
- Autonomous drive
- Line tracking
- Payload
- Surmountableness
- CCW rotation
- CW rotation
- Dot Matrix 8x8
- Long Distance communication
- Sound source identification
- Programmability
- Image recognition (option)
