= Capacitive displacement sensor =

Non-contact high precision sensors

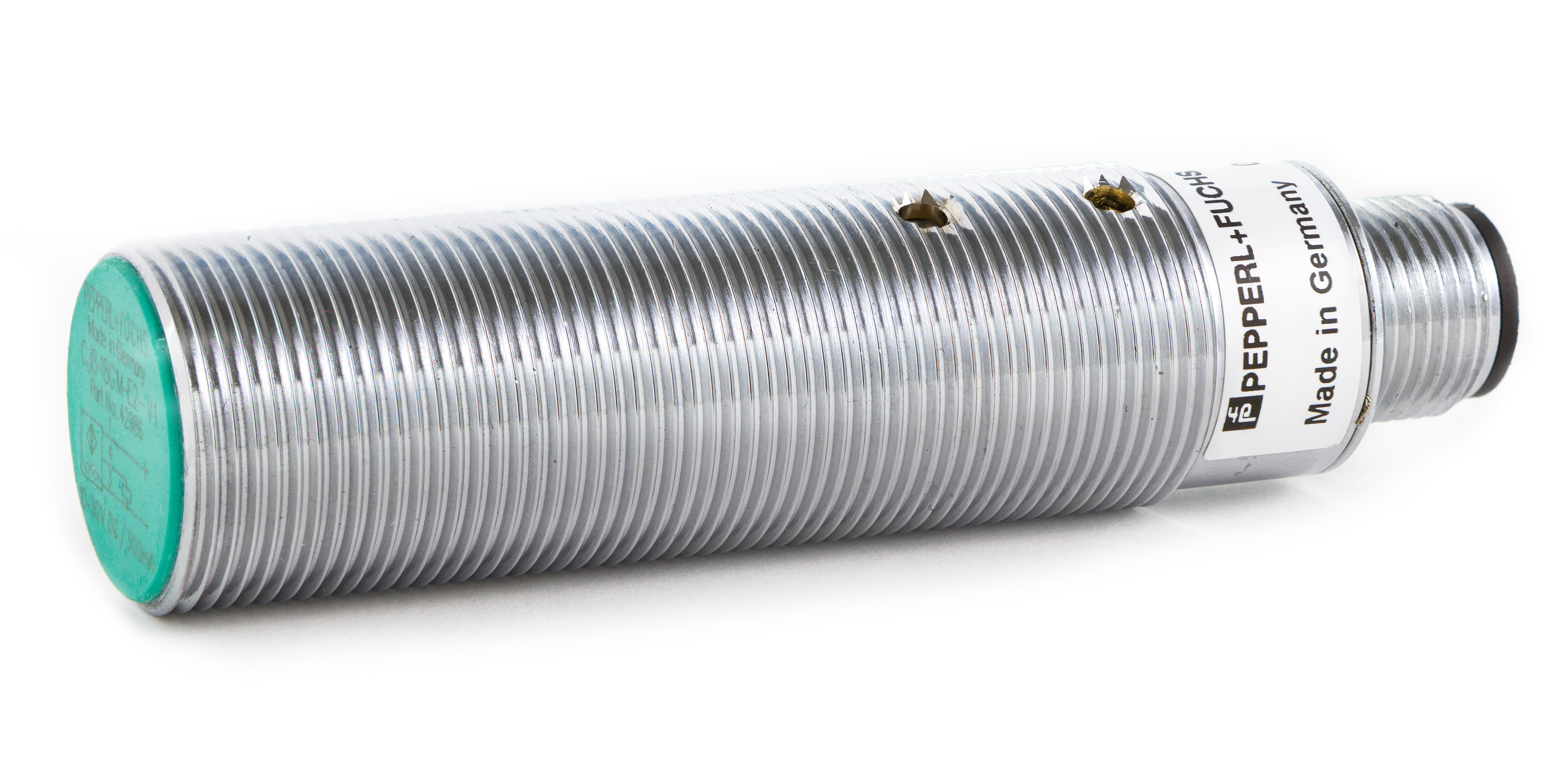
Industrial capacitive sensor

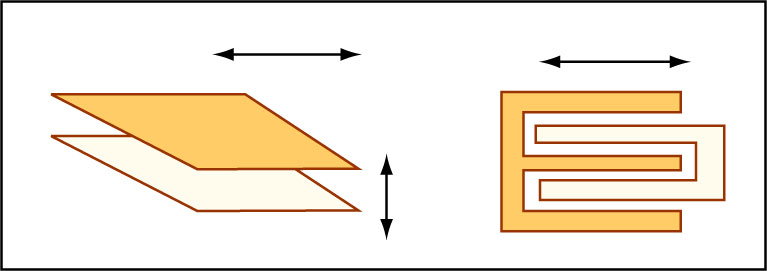
Diagrams of two capacitor structures useful for position sensing.

Capacitive displacement sensors are a kind of non-contact displacement sensor, measuring the position and change of position in capacitive materials to a high resolution. They are also able to measure the thickness or density of non-conductive materials. Capacitive displacement sensors are used in a wide variety of applications including semiconductor processing, assembly of precision equipment such as disk drives, precision thickness measurements, machine tool metrology and assembly line testing. These types of sensors can be found in machining and manufacturing facilities around the world.

== Basic capacitive theory ==
Two identical parallel conductive plates of area $A$ separated by a gap of distance $d$ will have a capacitance $C$ of:

$C = \dfrac{\varepsilon_0 \varepsilon_r A}{d}$

where $\varepsilon_0$ is the permittivity of free space constant and $\varepsilon_r$ is the relative permittivity (also called the dielectric constant) of the material in the gap.

There are two general types of capacitive displacement sensing systems. One type is used to measure the thicknesses of conductive materials. The other type measures the thickness of non-conductive materials or the level of a fluid.

A capacitive sensing system for conductive materials uses a model similar to the one described above, but in place of one of the conductive plates is the sensor, and in place of the other is the conductive target to be measured. Since the area of the probe and target remains constant, and the dielectric of the material in the gap (usually air) also remains constant, "any change in capacitance is a result of a change in the distance between the probe and the target." Therefore, the equation above can be simplified to:

$$C \propto \dfrac{1}{d}$$

where α indicates a proportional relationship. Due to this proportional relationship, a capacitive sensing system is able to measure changes in capacitance and translate these changes into distance measurements.

The operation of the sensor for measuring the thickness of non-conductive materials can be thought of as two capacitors in series, with each having a different dielectric (and dielectric constant). The sum of the thicknesses of the two dielectric materials remains constant but the thickness of each can vary. The thickness of the material to be measured displaces the other dielectric. The gap is often an air gap ($\varepsilon_r$≈1) and the material has a higher dielectric. As the material gets thicker, the capacitance increases and is sensed by the system.

A sensor for measuring fluid levels works as two capacitors in parallel with a constant total area. Again the difference in the dielectric constant of the fluid and the dielectric constant of air results in detectable changes in the capacitance between the conductive probes or plates.

== Applications ==
=== Precision positioning ===
One of the more common applications of capacitive sensors is for precision positioning. Capacitive displacement sensors can be used to measure the position of objects down to the nanometer level. This type of precise positioning is used in the semiconductor industry where silicon wafers need to be positioned for exposure. Capacitive sensors are also used to pre-focus the electron microscopes used in testing and examining the wafers.

=== Disc drive industry ===
In the disc drive industry, capacitive displacement sensors are used to measure the runout (a measure of how much the axis of rotation deviates from an ideal fixed line) of disc drives spindles. By knowing the exact runout of these spindles, disc drive manufacturers are able to determine the maximum amount of data that can be placed onto the drives. Capacitive sensors are also used to ensure that disc drive platters are orthogonal to the spindle before data is written to them.

=== Precision thickness measurements ===
Capacitive displacement sensors can be used to make very precise thickness measurements. Capacitive displacement sensors operate by measuring changes in position. If the position of a reference part of known thickness is measured, other parts can be subsequently measured and the differences in position can be used to determine the thickness of these parts. In order for this to be effective using a single probe, the parts must be completely flat and measured on a perfectly flat surface. If the part to be measured has any curvature or deformity, or simply does not rest firmly against the flat surface, the distance between the part to be measured and the surface it is placed upon will be erroneously included in the thickness measurement. This error can be eliminated by using two capacitive sensors to measure a single part. Capacitive sensors are placed on either side of the part to be measured. By measuring the parts from both sides, curvature and deformities are taken into account in the measurement and their effects are not included in the thickness readings.

The thickness of plastic materials can be measured with the material placed between two electrodes a set distance apart. These form a type of capacitor. The plastic when placed between the electrodes acts as a dielectric and displaces air (which has a dielectric constant of 1, different from the plastic). Consequently, the capacitance between the electrodes changes. The capacitance changes can then be measured and correlated with the material's thickness.

Capacitive sensor circuits can be constructed that are able to detect changes in capacitance on the order of 10^{−5} picofarads (10 attofarads).

=== Non-conductive targets ===
While capacitive displacement sensors are most often used to sense changes in position of conductive targets, they can also be used to sense the thickness and/or density of non-conductive targets as well. A non-conductive object placed in between the probe and conductive target will have a different dielectric constant than the air in the gap and will therefore change the Capacitance between probe and target. (See the first equation above) By analyzing this change in capacitance, the thickness and density of the non-conductor can be determined.

=== Machine tool metrology ===
Capacitive displacement sensors are often used in metrology applications. In many cases, sensors are used “to measure shape errors in the part being produced. But they also can measure the errors arising in the equipment used to manufacture the part, a practice known as machine tool metrology”. In many cases, the sensors are used to analyze and optimize the rotation of spindles in various machine tools, examples include surface grinders, lathes, milling machines, and air bearing spindles. By measuring errors in the machines themselves, rather than simply measuring errors in the final products, problems can be dealt with and fixed earlier in the manufacturing process.

=== Assembly line testing ===
Capacitive displacement sensors are often used in assembly line testing. Sometimes they are used to test assembled parts for uniformity, thickness or other design features. At other times, they are used to simply look for the presence or absence of a certain component, such as glue. Using capacitive sensors to test assembly line parts can help to prevent quality concerns further along in the production process.

== Comparison to eddy current displacement sensors ==
Capacitive displacement sensors share many similarities to eddy current (or inductive) displacement sensors; however capacitive sensors use an electric field as opposed to the magnetic field used by eddy current sensors This leads to a variety of differences between the two sensing technologies, with the most notable differences being that capacitive sensors are generally capable of higher resolution measurements, and eddy current sensors work in dirty environments while capacitive sensors do not.

== Other non-displacement capacitive sensing applications ==
- Testing the moisture content of grain
- Soil moisture
- Humidity
- Detecting water content in fuels
- Fuel composition sensors (for flex fuel vehicles)
- Capacitive load cells

== See also ==
- Proximity sensor
- Capacitive sensing
- List of sensors
- Inductive sensor
