= Ground speed radar =

Radar-based speed sensor onboard an aircraft

In aviation, a ground speed radar is a speed sensor consisting of a radar installed onboard of an aircraft. It is used to provide a non-mechanical way of measuring the speed in relation to the surface of the Earth. The system fires a radar beam towards the ground and measures the Doppler shift of the returning beam. This information is then sent to the engine control unit which calculates the forward speed.

== See also ==
- Radar gun
