= Rain sensor =

Device to detect water from rain

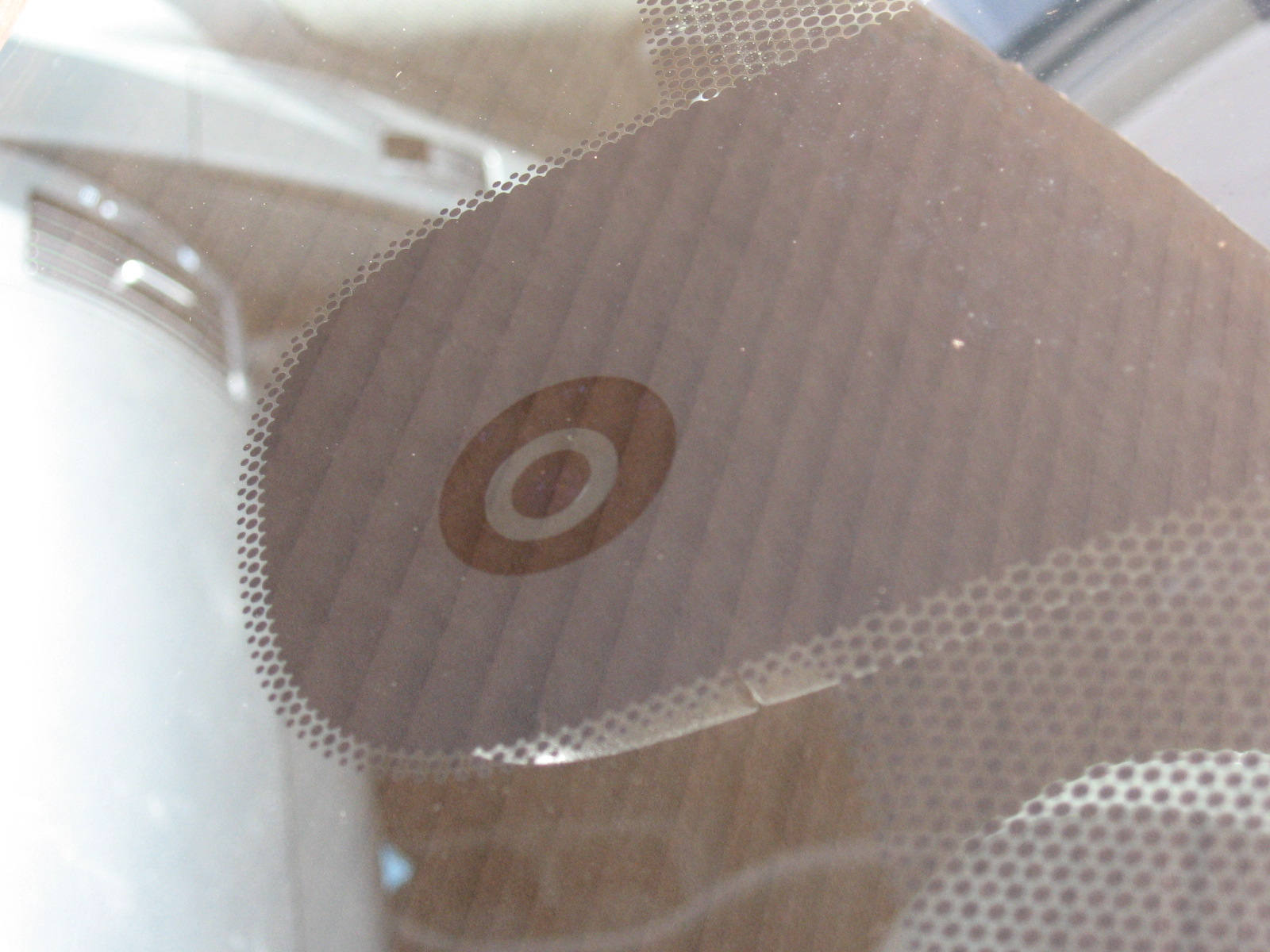
Rain sensor on the windshield of a car

A rain sensor or rain switch is a switching device activated by rainfall. There are two main applications for rain sensors. The first is a water conservation device connected to an automatic irrigation system that causes the system to shut down in the event of rainfall. The second is a device used to protect the interior of an automobile from rain and to support the automatic mode of windscreen wipers.

== Principle of operation ==
The rain sensor works on the principle of total internal reflection. An infrared light shone at a 45-degree angle on a clear area of the windshield is reflected and is sensed by the sensor inside the car. When it rains, the wet glass causes the light to scatter and a lesser amount of light gets reflected back to the sensor.

An additional application in professional satellite communications antennas is to trigger a rain blower on the aperture of the antenna feed, to remove water droplets from the mylar cover that keeps pressurized and dry air inside the wave-guides.

== Irrigation sensors ==
Rain sensors for irrigation systems are available in both wireless and hard-wired versions, most employing hygroscopic disks that swell in the presence of rain and shrink back down again as they dry out — an electrical switch is in turn depressed or released by the hygroscopic disk stack, and the rate of drying is typically adjusted by controlling the ventilation reaching the stack. However, some electrical type sensors are also marketed that use tipping bucket or conductance type probes to measure rainfall. Wireless and wired versions both use similar mechanisms to temporarily suspend watering by the irrigation controller specifically they are connected to the irrigation controller's sensor terminals, or are installed in series with the solenoid valve common circuit such that they prevent the opening of any valves when rain has been sensed.

Some irrigation rain sensors also contain a freeze sensor to keep the system from operating in freezing temperatures, particularly where irrigation systems are still used over the winter.

Some type of sensor is required on new lawn sprinkler systems in Florida, New Jersey, Minnesota, Connecticut and most parts of Texas.

== Automotive sensors ==
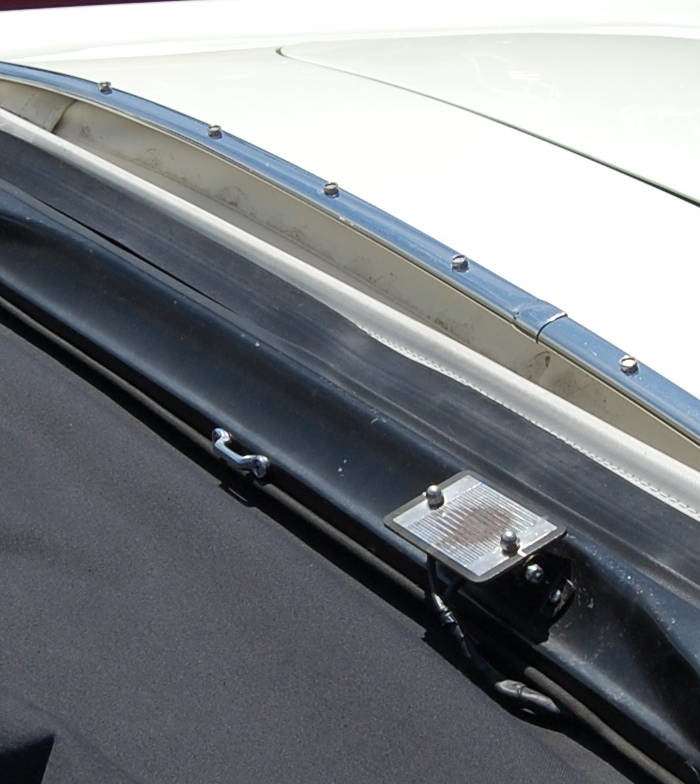
General Motors automatic rain sensor installed on a 1955 Chevrolet Bel Air convertible.

In 1958, the Cadillac Motor Car Division of General Motors experimented with a water-sensitive switch that triggered various electric motors to close the convertible top and raise the open windows of a specially-built Eldorado Biarritz model, in case of rain. The first such device appears to have been used for that same purpose in a concept vehicle designated Le Sabre and built around 1950–51.

General Motors' automatic rain sensor for convertible tops was available as a dealer-installed option during the 1950s for vehicles such as the Chevrolet Bel Air.

For the 1996 model year, Cadillac once again equipped cars with an automatic rain sensor; this time to automatically trigger the windshield wipers and adjust their speed to conditions as necessary.

In December 2017 Tesla started rolling out an OTA update (2017.52.3) enabling their AP2.x cars to utilize the onboard cameras to passively detect rain without the use of a dedicated sensor.

Most vehicles with this feature have an auto position on the control column.

== Physics of rain sensor ==
A diagram showing the operation of an optical rain sensor

The most common modern rain sensors are based on the principle of total internal reflection. At all times, an infrared light is beamed at a 45-degree angle into the windshield from the interior. If the glass is dry, the critical angle for total internal refraction is around 42°. This value is obtained with the total internal refraction formula.

$\sin (\theta_\text{c}) = \frac{n_1}{n_2}$

where $n_1 = 1$ is the approximate value of air's refraction index for infrared and $n_2 = 1.5$ is the approximate value of the glass refraction index, also for infrared. Since the incident angle of light is 45°, all the light is reflected, and the detector receives maximum intensity.

If the glass is wet, the critical angle changes to around 60° because the refraction index of water is higher than air ($n_1 = 1.3$). In that case, because the incident angle is 45°, total internal reflection is not obtained. Part of the light beam is transmitted through the glass, and the intensity measured for reflection is lower: the system detects water, and the wipers turn on.

== See also ==
- List of sensors
- Rain gauge
