= Air flow meter =

Device that measures how much air is flowing through a tube

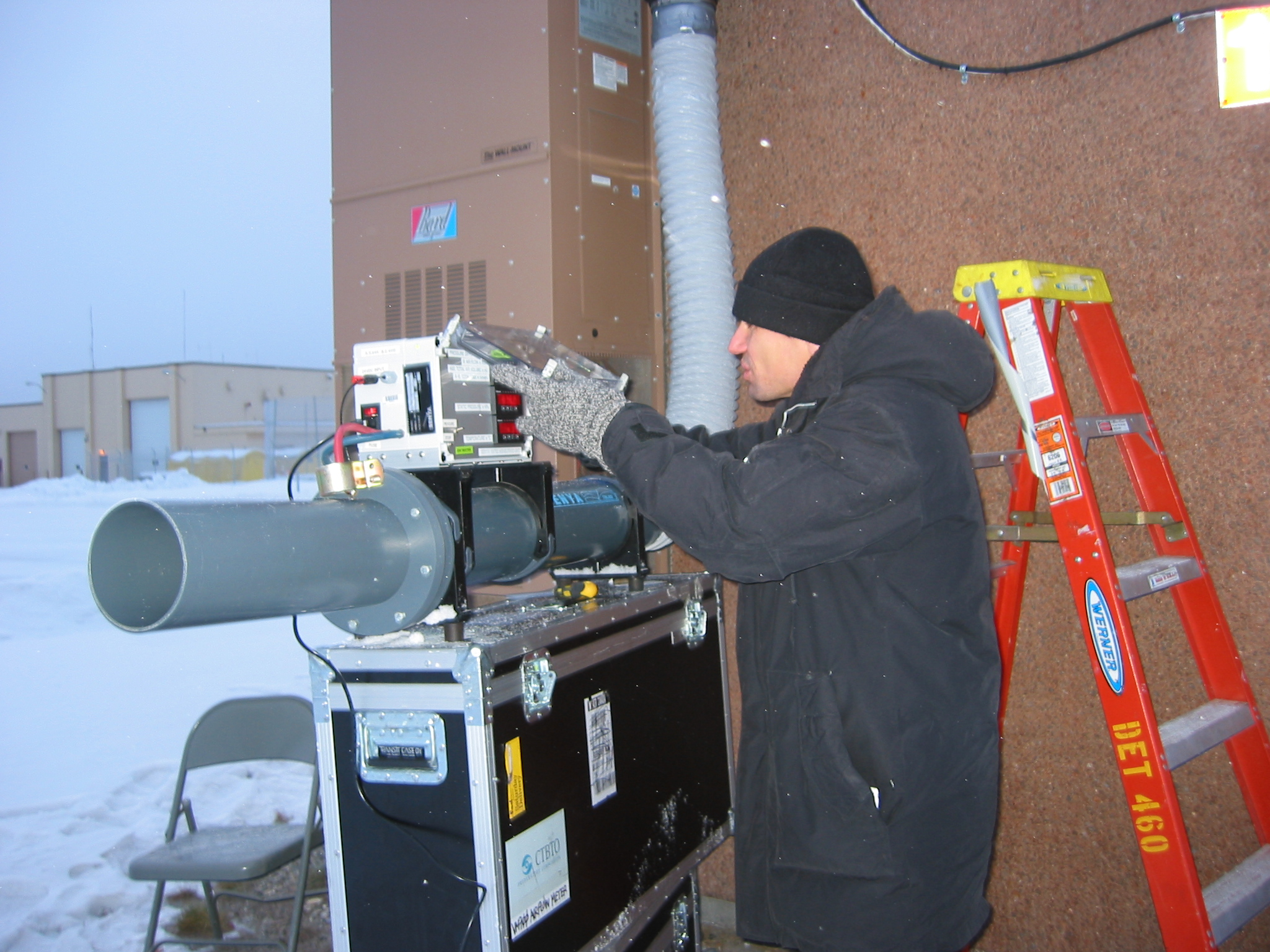
Conducting air flow measurements at radionuclide station RN76, Salchaket, USA

An air flow meter is a device similar to an anemometer that measures air flow, i.e. how much air is flowing through a tube. It does not measure the volume of the air passing through the tube, it measures the mass of air flowing through the device per unit time, though Thus air flow meters are simply an application of mass flow meters for the medium of air. Typically, mass air flow measurements are expressed in the units of kilograms per second (kg/s) or feet per minute (fpm), which can be converted to volume measurements of cubic metres per second (cumecs) or cubic feet per minute (cfm).

== In industrial environments ==
Air flow meters monitor air (compressed, forced, or ambient) in many manufacturing processes. In many industries, preheated air (called "combustion air") is added to boiler fuel just before fuel ignition to ensure the proper ratio of fuel to air for an efficient flame. Pharmaceutical factories and coal pulverizers use forced air as a means to force particle movement or ensure a dry atmosphere. Air flow is also monitored in mining and nuclear environments to ensure the safety of people.

== See also ==
- Anemometer
- List of sensors
- Mass flow sensor
- Category:Engines
- Category:Engine fuel system technology
- Thermal mass flow meter
