= Zinc oxide nanorod sensor =

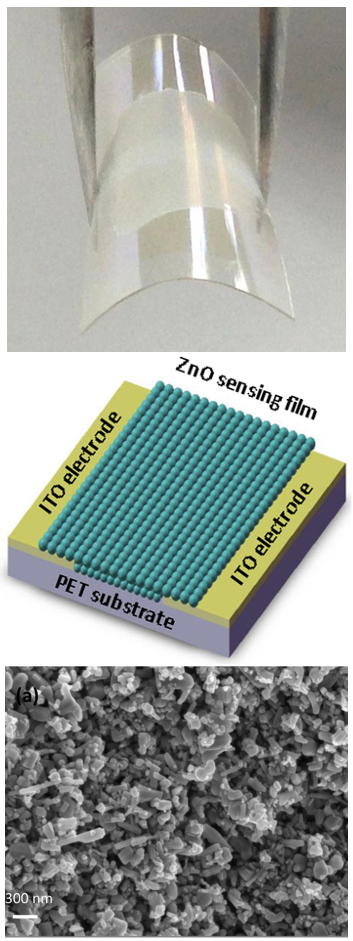
Flexible gas sensor based on ZnO nanorods and its internal structure. ITO stands for indium tin oxide and PET for polyethylene terephthalate.

A zinc oxide nanorod sensor or ZnO nanorod sensor is an electronic or optical device detecting presence of certain gas or liquid molecules (e.g. humidity, NO, hydrogen, etc.) in the ambient atmosphere. The sensor exploits enhanced surface area (and thus surface activity) intrinsic to all nano-sized materials, including ZnO nanorods. Adsorption of molecules on the nanorods can be detected through variation of the nanorods' properties, such as photoluminescence, electrical conductivity, vibration frequency, mass, etc. The simplest and thus most popular way is to pass electrical current through the nanorods and observe its changes upon exposure to gas. Synthesis can be obtained by a hydrothermal method using 1:1 molar solution of hexamine and zinc nitrate solution kept together for 56 hours in an autoclave at 60–70 degrees Celsius.

== See also ==
- Hydrogen safety
- List of sensors
- Nanoelectromechanical systems
