= Nitrogen oxide sensor =

Device to detect nitrogen oxide

A nitrogen oxide sensor or NO_{x} sensor is typically a high-temperature device built to detect nitrogen oxides in combustion environments such as an automobile, truck tailpipe or smokestack.

== Overview ==
The term NO_{x} represents several forms of nitrogen oxides such as NO (nitric oxide), NO_{2} (nitrogen dioxide) and N_{2}O (nitrous oxide, also known as laughing gas). In a gasoline engine, NO is the most common form of NO_{x} at around 93%, while NO_{2} is around 5% and the rest is N_{2}O. There are other forms of NO_{x} such as N_{2}O_{4} (the dimer of NO_{2}), which only exists at lower temperatures, and N_{2}O_{5}, for example.

Meanwhile, for diesel engines, the emissions situation is different. Owing to their much higher combustion temperatures (resulting from their high cylinder compression ratios as well as turbocharging or supercharging), diesel engines produce much higher engine-out NO_{x} emissions than spark-ignition gasoline engines. The recent availability of Selective catalytic reduction (SCR) allows properly equipped diesel engines to emit similar values of NO_{x} at the tailpipe compared to a typical gasoline engine with a 3-way catalyst. The SCR changes the harmful nitrogen oxides by adding the solution AdBlue which reduces environmental pollution and protects the exhaust system. In addition, the diesel oxidation catalyst significantly increases the fraction of NO_{2} in "NO_{x}" by oxidizing over 50% of NO using the excess oxygen in the diesel exhaust gases.

Advances of sensor technology enable people to monitor air quality through widely distributed low-cost sensors. The drive to develop a NO_{x} sensors arises from environmental factors. NO_{x} gases can cause various problems such as smog and acid rain. Many governments around the world have passed laws to limit their emissions (along with other combustion gases such as SOx (oxides of sulfur), CO (carbon monoxide) and CO_{2} (carbon dioxide) and hydrocarbons). Companies have realized that one way of minimizing NO_{x} emissions is to first detect them and then to employ some sort of feedback loop in the combustion process, thereby enabling the minimization of NO_{x} production by, for example, combustion optimization or regeneration of NO_{x} traps. Therefore, in many applications with exhaust-gas treatment systems, one NOx sensor is used upstream of the exhaust-gas treatment system (upstream) and a second sensor is used downstream of the exhaust-gas treatment system. The upstream sensor is used for the aforementioned feedback loop. Meanwhile, the downstream sensor is used mainly to confirm that the legislated emissions limits have not been exceeded.

== Challenges ==
=== Harsh environment ===
Due to the high temperature of the combustion environment, only certain types of material can operate in situ. The majority of NO_{x} sensors developed have been made out of ceramic type metal oxides, with the most common being yttria-stabilized zirconia (YSZ), which is currently used in the decades-old oxygen sensor. The YSZ is compacted into a dense ceramic and conducts oxygen ions (O^{2−}) at the high temperatures of a tailpipe such at 400 °C and above. To get a signal from the sensor a pair of high-temperature electrodes such as noble metals (platinum, gold, or palladium) or other metal oxides are placed onto the surface and an electrical signal such as the change in voltage or current is measured as a function of NO_{x} concentration.

=== High sensitivity and durability required ===
The levels of NO are around 50–1000 ppm (parts per million) and NO_{2} 10–100 ppm in a range of 1–10% O_{2}. The sensor has to be very sensitive to pick up these levels.

The main challenges in the sensor development are selectivity, sensitivity, stability, reproducibility, response time, limit of detection, and cost. In addition due to the harsh environment of combustion the high gas flow rate can cool the sensor which alters the signal or it can delaminate the electrodes over time and soot particles can degrade the materials.

One of the major challenges faced by such gas sensors is humidity. The relative effect on signal response is highly subjective to the sensor type. Electrochemical sensors are mostly immune from humidity effect as water molecules help regulate the electrolyte concentration but long term exposure to dry gas can reduce the solvent concentration of the electrolyte. High amount of cross sensitivity has been observed in gas sensors due to similarity in electron exchange mechanism between target gases and water molecules.

== See also ==
- List of sensors
