= Engine-indicating and crew-alerting system =

Type of alert system on aircraft

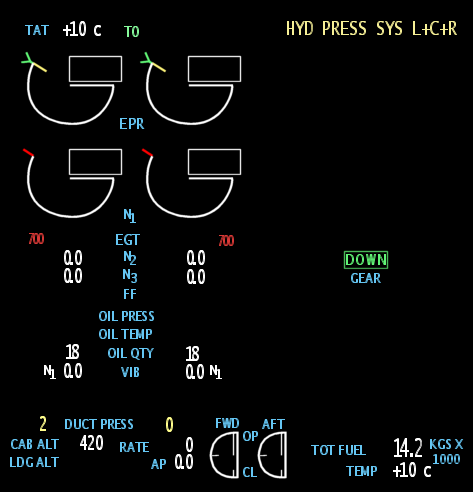
Boeing 777 EICAS

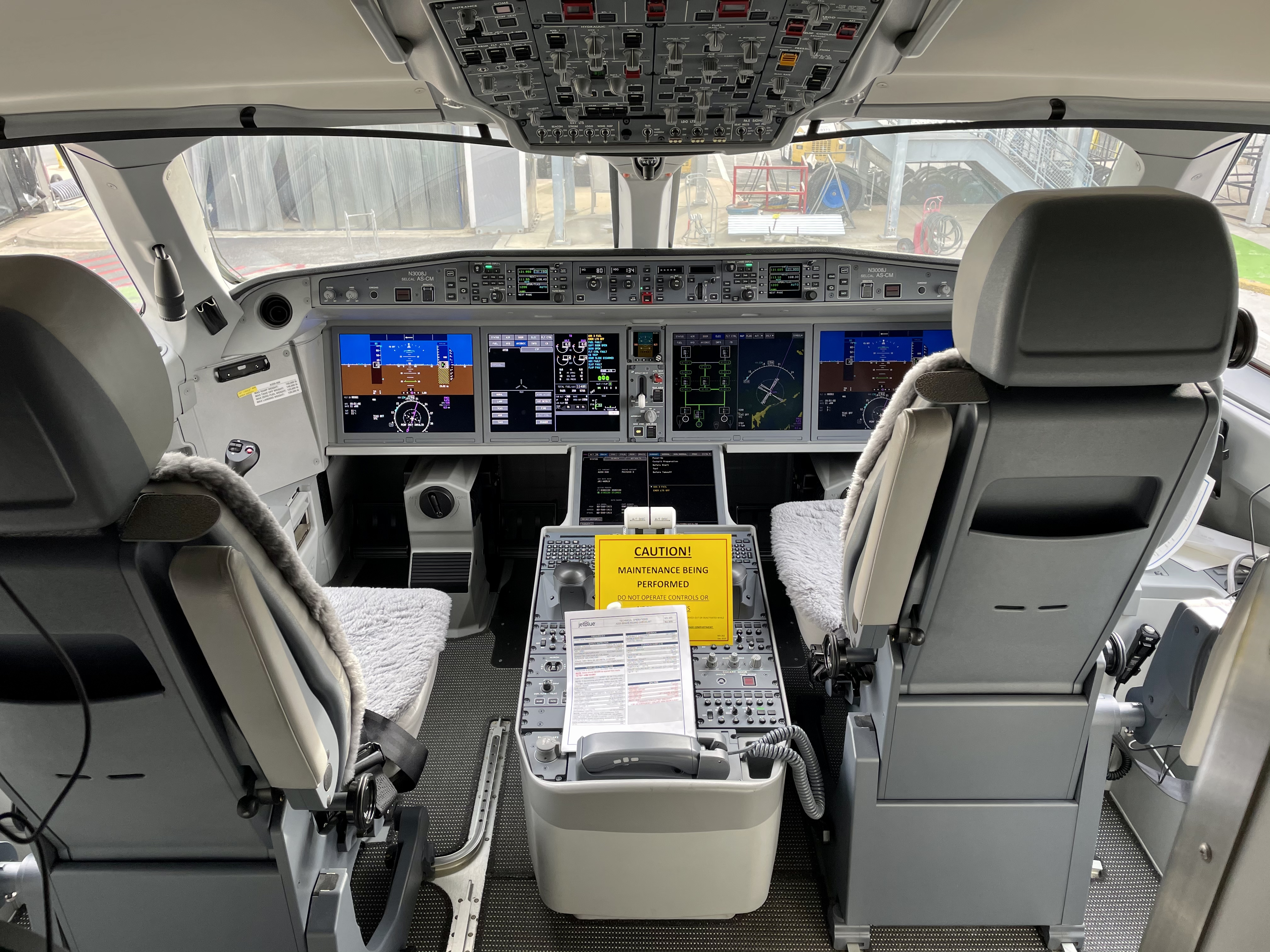
Airbus A220 EICAS at the center

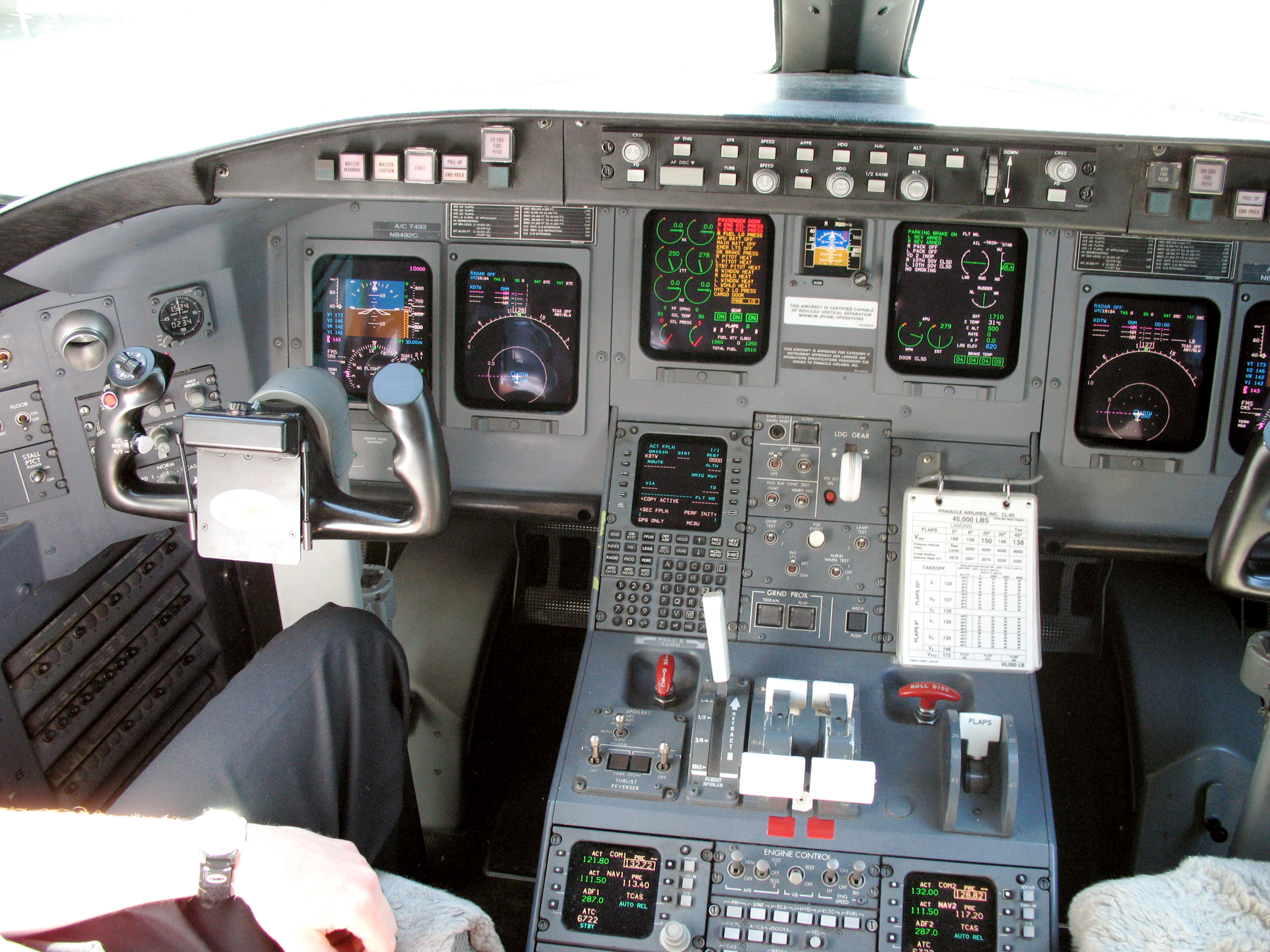
Bombardier CRJ EICAS on the two central screens

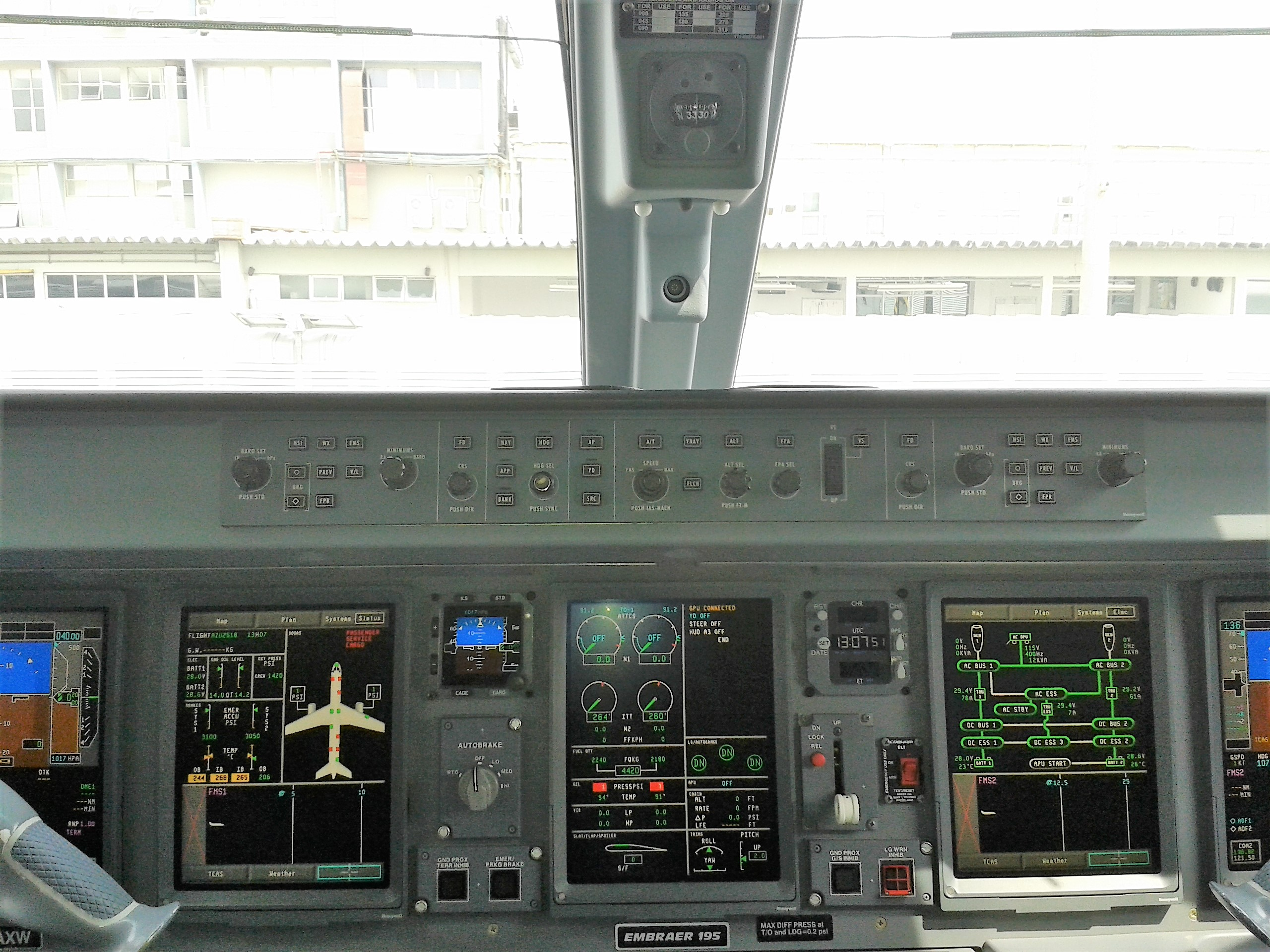
Embraer E-Jet EICAS

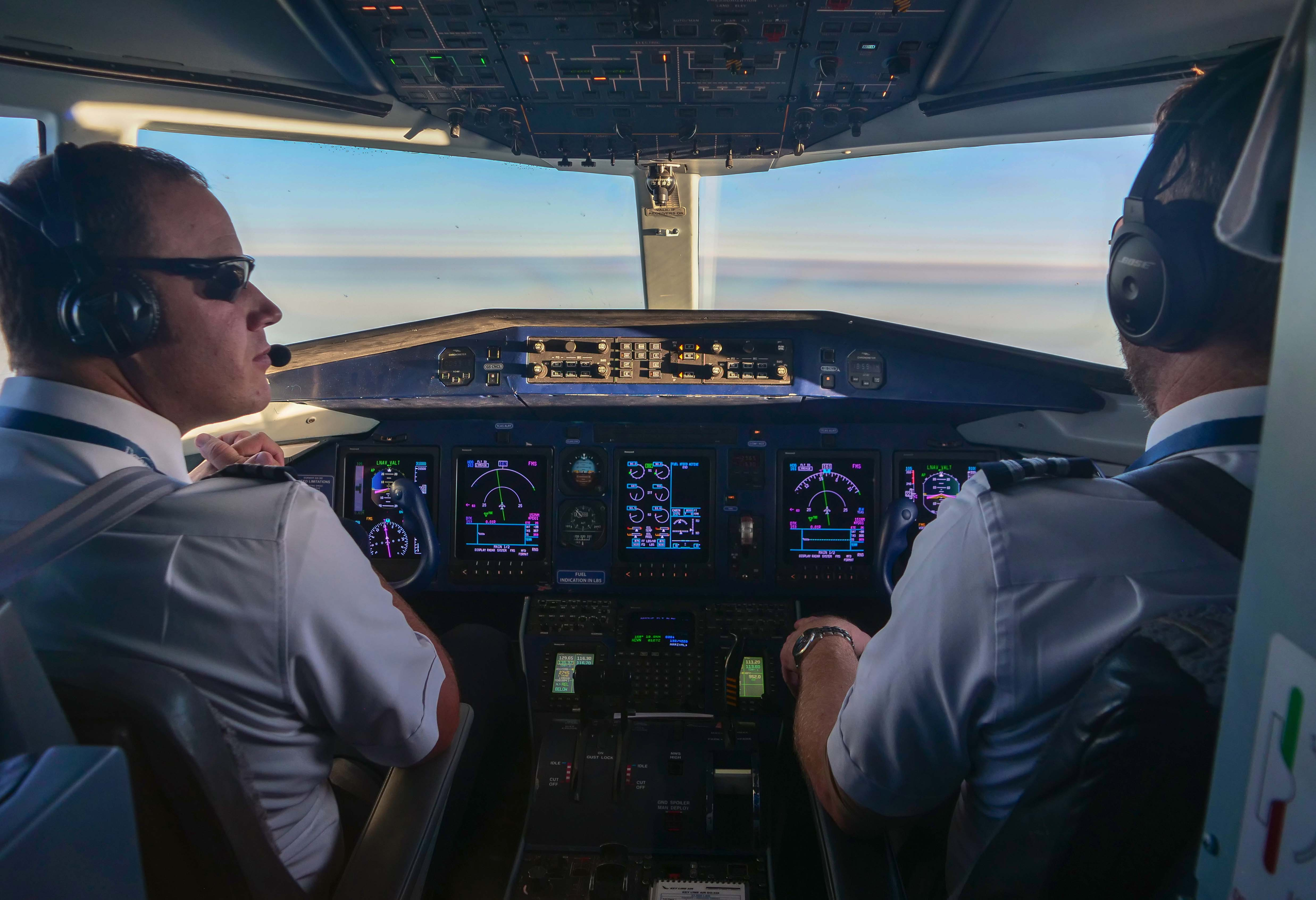
Fairchild Dornier 328JET EICAS on the central screen

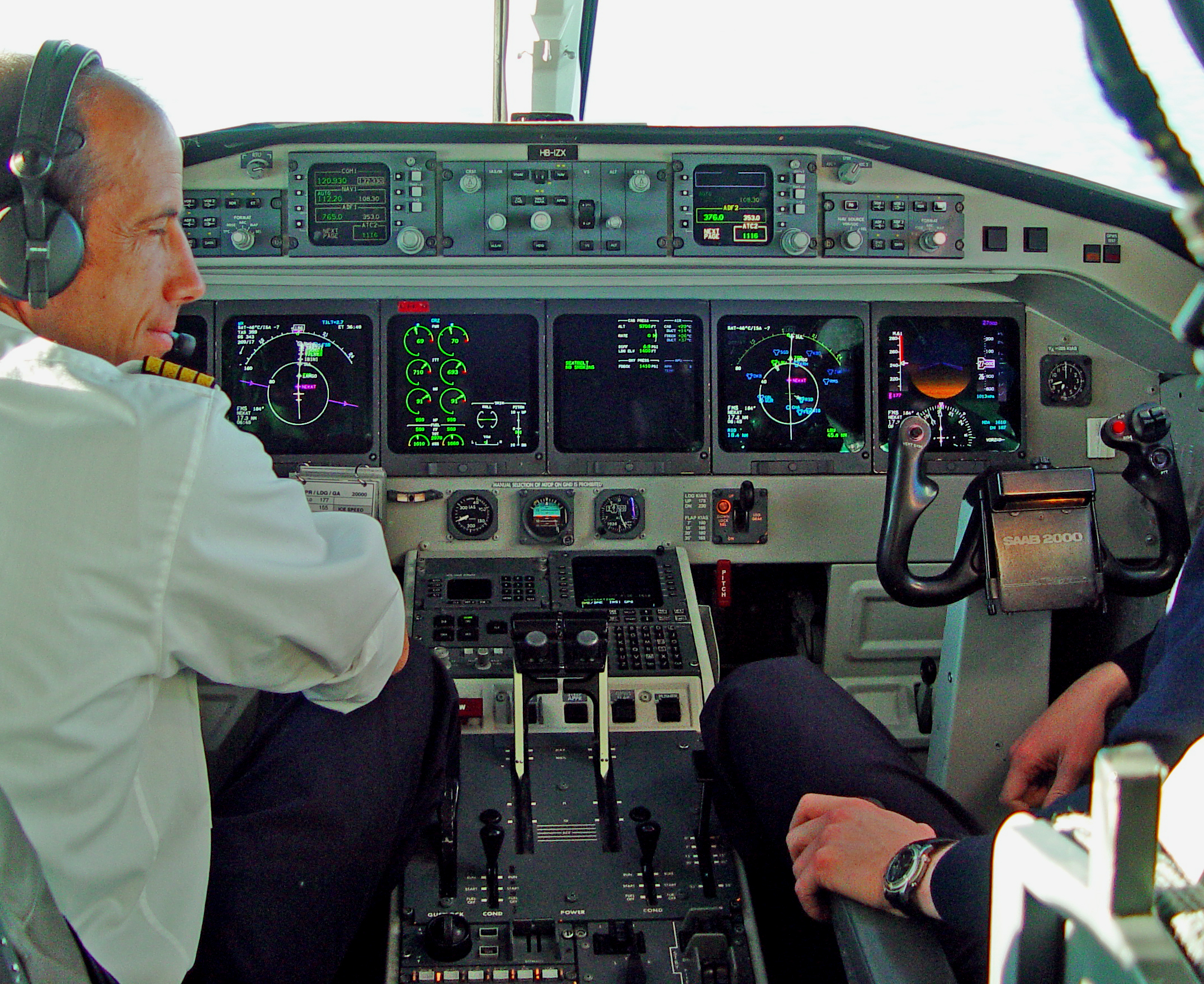
Saab 2000 EICAS on the two central screens

An engine-indicating and crew-alerting system (EICAS) is an integrated system used in modern aircraft to provide aircraft flight crew with instrumentation and crew annunciations for aircraft engines and other systems. On EICAS equipped aircraft the "recommended remedial action" is called a checklist.

== Components ==
EICAS typically includes instrumentation of various engine parameters, including for example speed of rotation, temperature values including exhaust gas temperature, fuel flow and quantity, oil pressure etc. Other aircraft systems typically monitored by EICAS are for example hydraulic, pneumatic, electrical, deicing, environmental and control surface systems. EICAS has high connectivity and provides data acquisition and routing.

== Limitations ==
On some Bombardier aircraft, it is possible to call up the wrong checklist. Messages forbidding take-off can be shown as advisories.

== Gallery ==
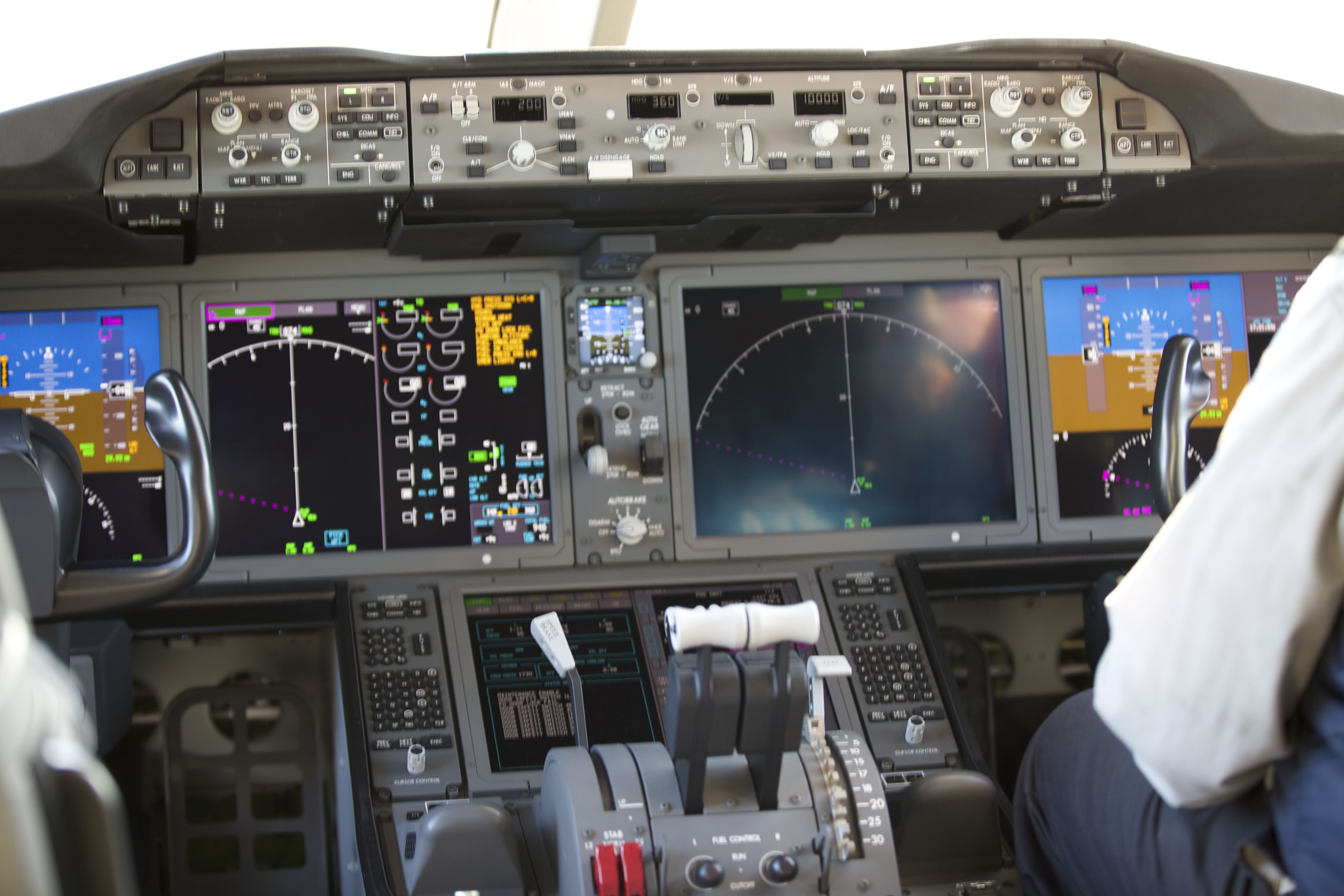
EICAS of a Boeing 787 at the center-left

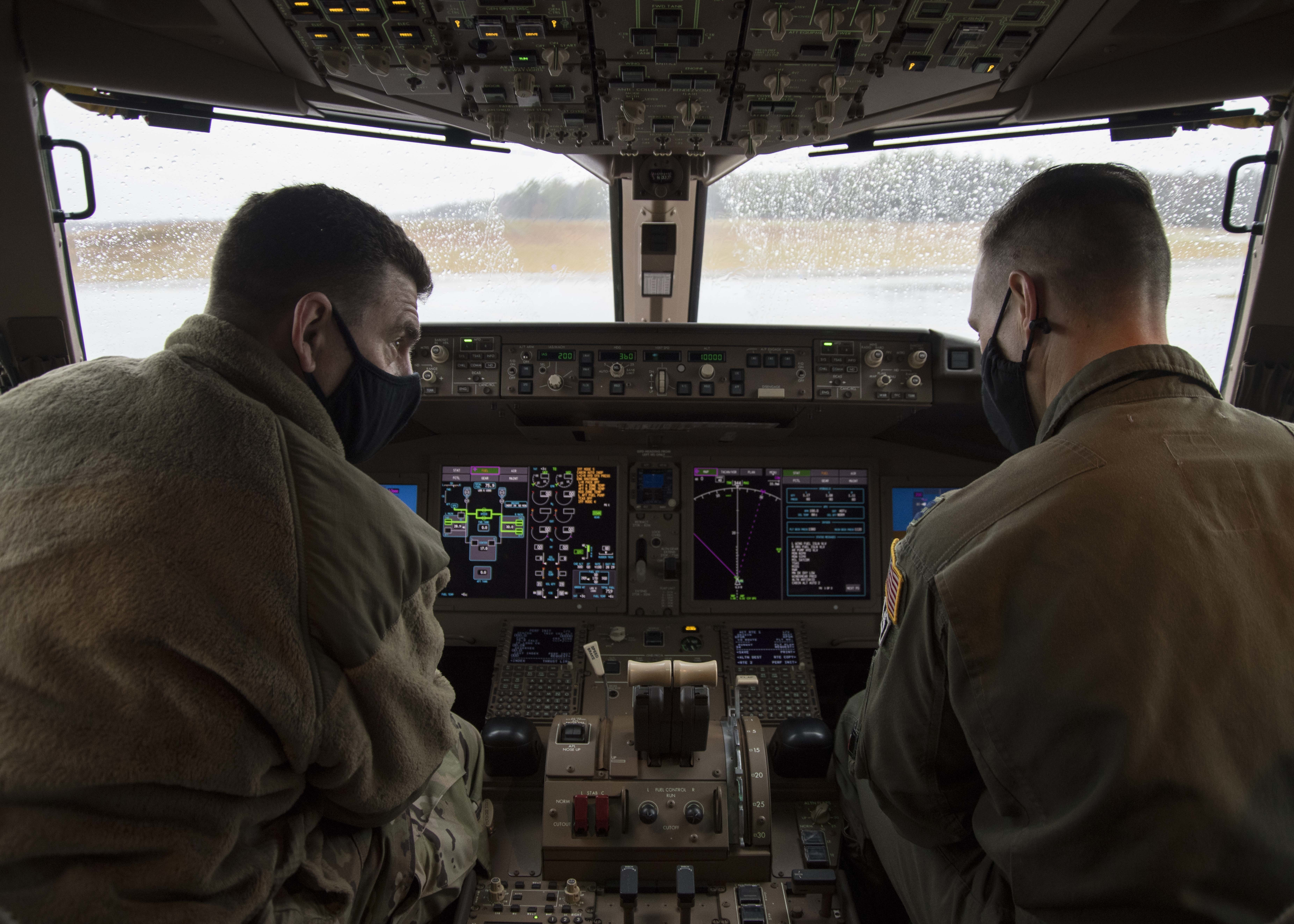
EICAS of a Boeing KC-46 at the center-left

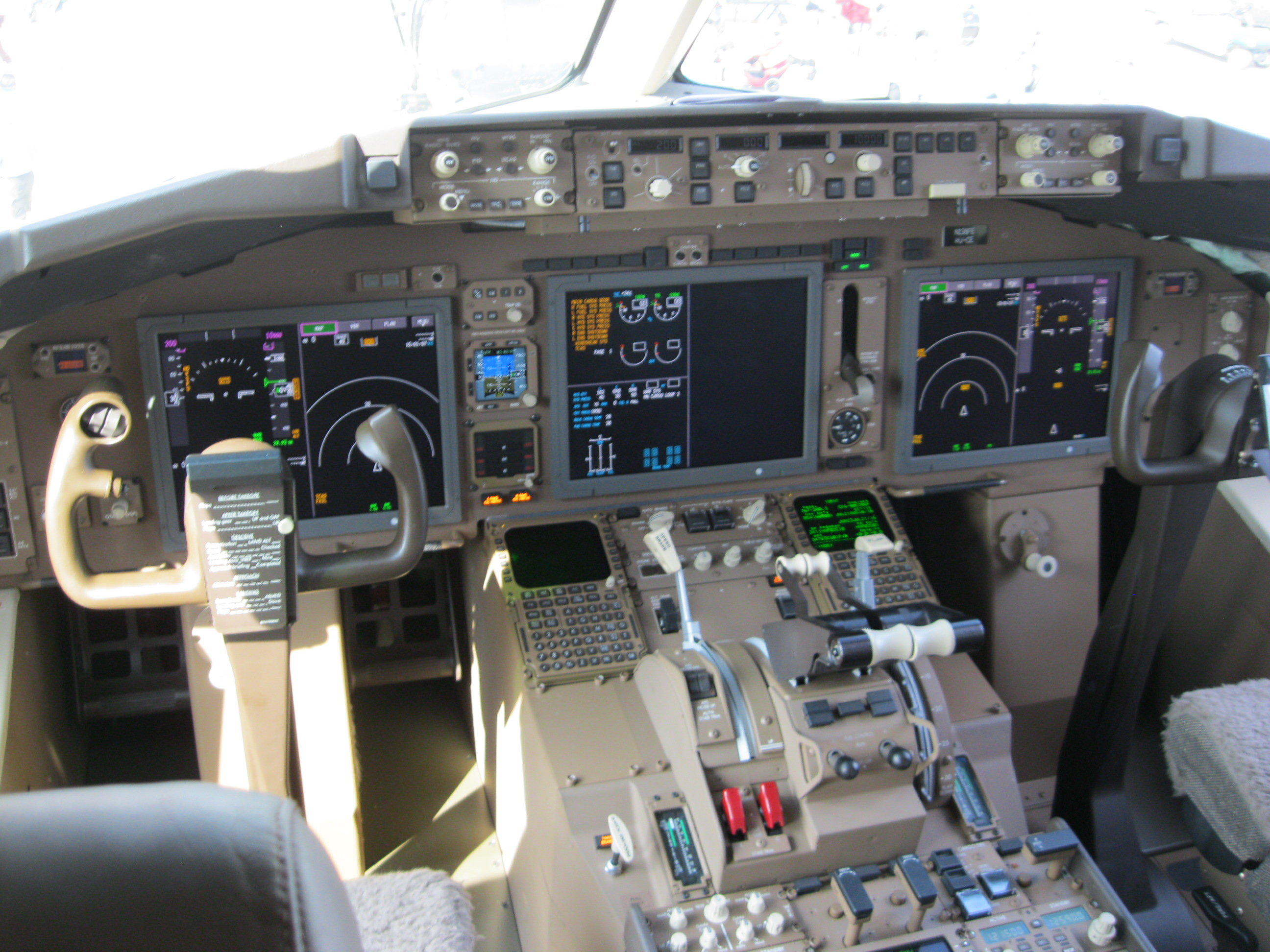
Boeing 757 and Boeing 767 optional cockpit upgrade EICAS at the center-left

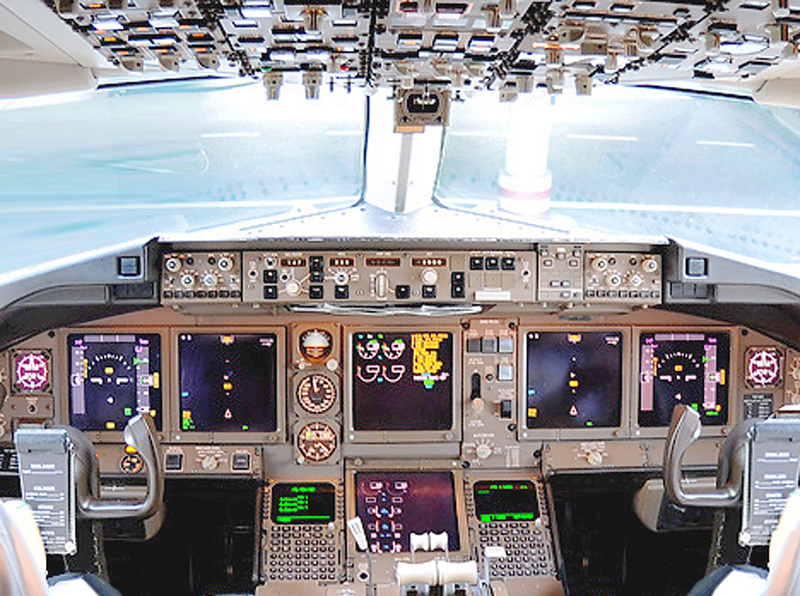
EICAS of a Boeing 767-400 at the center

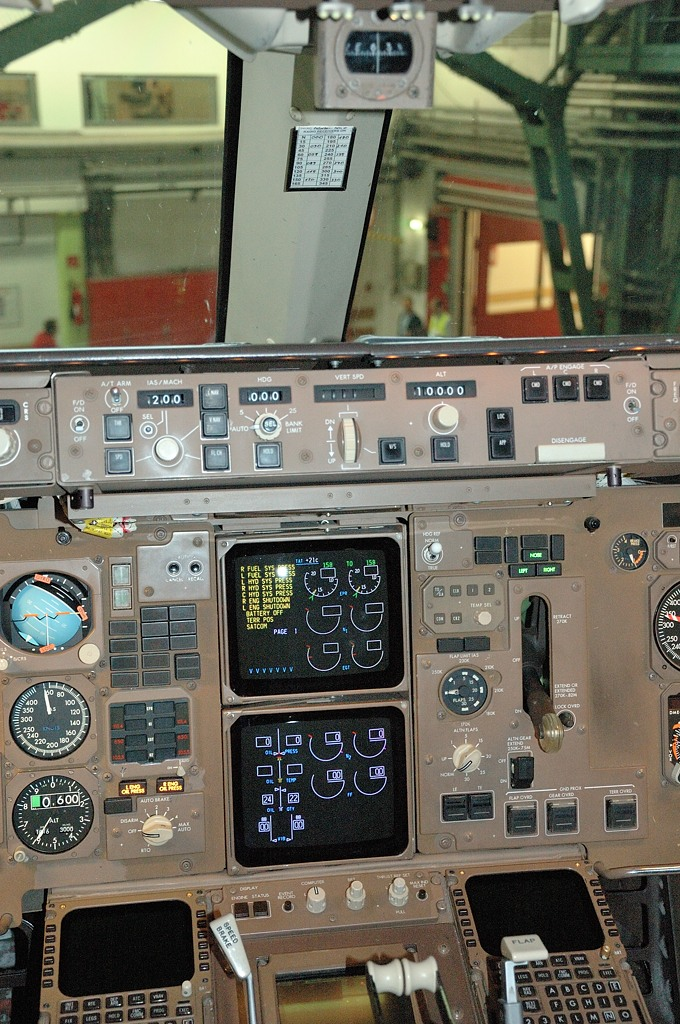
EICAS of a Boeing 767

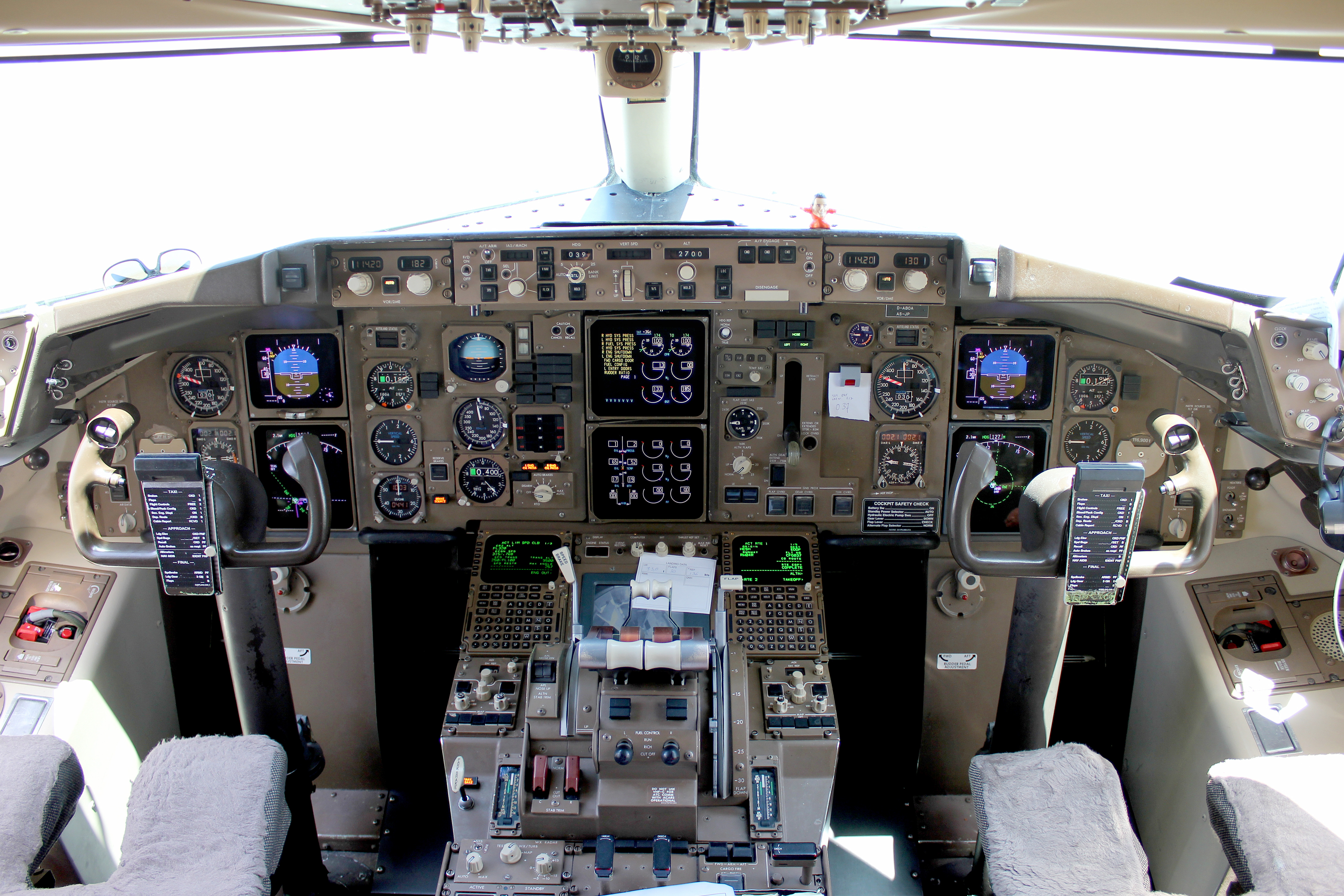
EICAS of a Boeing 757 at the center

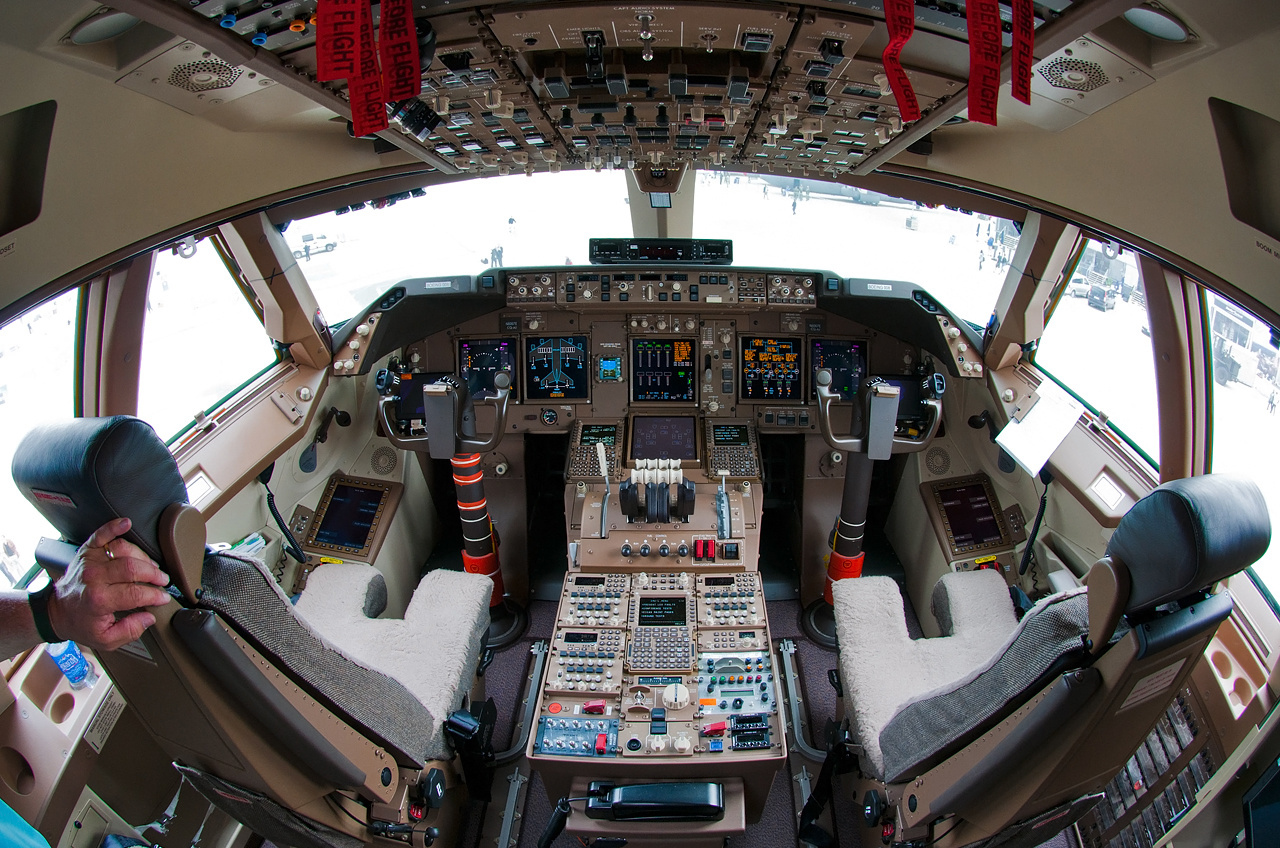
EICAS of a Boeing 747-8 at the center

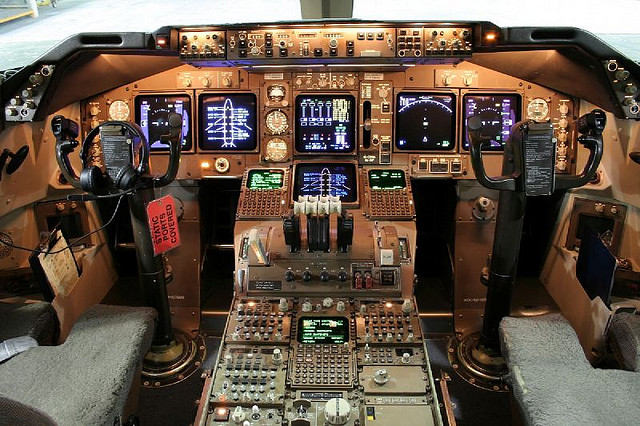
EICAS of a Boeing 747-400 at the center

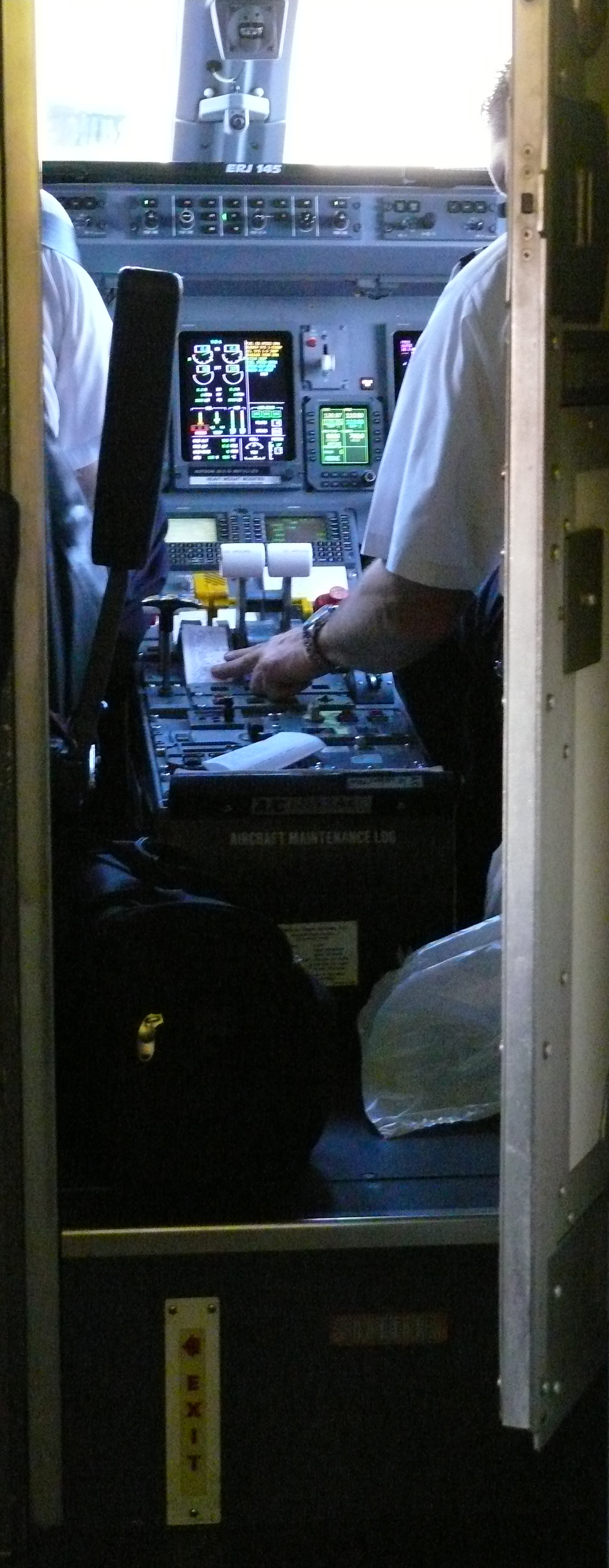
EICAS of an Embraer ERJ

== See also ==
- Electronic centralised aircraft monitor (ECAM), a similar system by Airbus
