= Acoustic radiometer =

Device used to measure elements of sound

An acoustic radiometer is a device designed to measure acoustic radiation, and thus several other properties of sound, such as sound intensity.

It commonly consists of a light pendulum with a sensing element, such as a disk or ball attached to it. The sensing element moves in response to a change in pressure, until it moves to a point where the force is balanced by an elastic force of a wire attached to the fulcrum of the pendulum. The radiation pressure is then calculated from the amount the pendulum swung.
