= Catadioptric sensor =

Panormaic sensor design

A catadioptric sensor is a visual sensor that contains mirrors (catoptrics) and lenses (dioptrics), a combined catadioptric system. These are panoramic sensors created by pointing a camera at a curved mirror.
