= Variable reluctance sensor =

Type of transducer

A variable reluctance sensor (commonly called a VR sensor) is a transducer that measures changes in magnetic reluctance. When combined with basic electronic circuitry, the sensor detects the change in presence or proximity of ferrous objects.

With more complex circuitry and the addition of software and specific mechanical hardware, a VR sensor can also provide measurements of linear velocity, angular velocity, position, and torque.

== Uses and applications ==
A VR sensor used as a simple proximity sensor can determine the position of a mechanical link in a piece of industrial equipment.

A crankshaft position sensor (in an automobile engine) is used to provide the angular position of the crankshaft to the engine control unit. The engine control unit can then calculate engine speed (angular velocity).

Speed sensors used in automobile transmissions are used to measure the rotational speed (angular velocity) of shafts within the transmission. The engine control unit or transmission control unit (depending on the particular automobile) uses these sensors to determine when to shift from one gear to the next.

A pickup used in an electric guitar (or other musical instrument) detects vibrations of the metallic "strings". See Pickup (music technology) for details of this application.

== Construction ==
This sensor consists of a permanent magnet, a ferromagnetic pole piece, and coil of wire.

== Interface circuits ==
VR sensors need waveform shaping for their output to be digitally readable. The normal output of a VR sensor is an analog signal, shaped much like a sine wave. The frequency and amplitude of the analog signal is proportional to the target's velocity. This waveform needs to be squared up, and flattened off by a comparator like electronic chip to be digitally readable. While discrete VR sensor interface circuits can be implemented, the semiconductor industry also offers integrated solutions. Examples are the MAX9924 to MAX9927 VR sensor interface IC from Maxim Integrated products, LM1815 VR sensor amplifier from National Semiconductor and NCV1124 from ON semiconductor. An integrated VR sensor interface circuit like the MAX9924 features a differential input stage to provide enhanced noise immunity, Precision Amplifier and Comparator with user enabled Internal Adaptive Peak Threshold or user programmed external threshold to provide a wide dynamic range and zero-crossing detection circuit to provide accurate phase Information.

== Reluctor rings ==
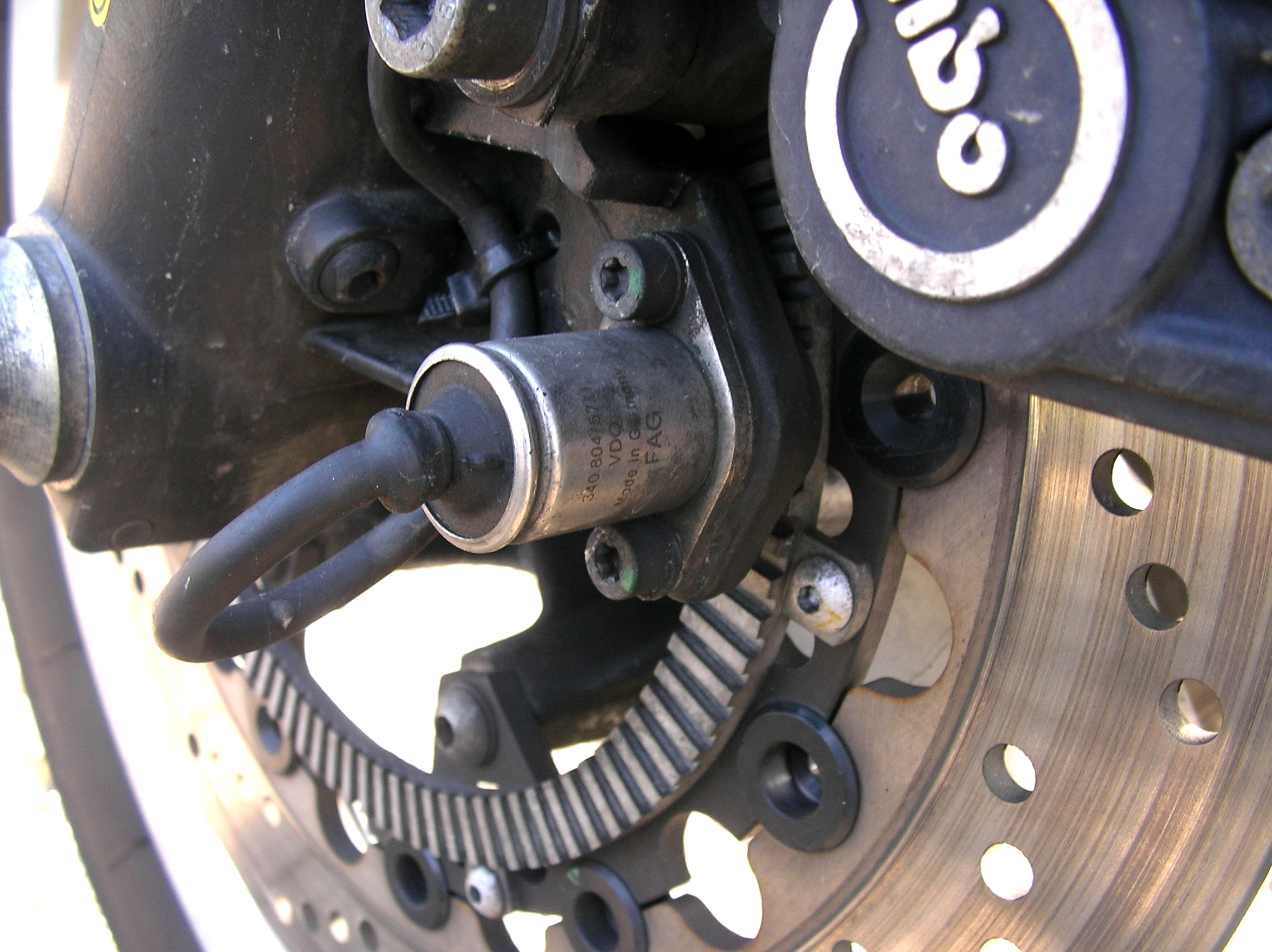
A toothed reluctor ring on an ABS sensor

To measure the angular position or rotational speed of a shaft, a toothed reluctor ring made of ferrous material (sometimes simply called a reluctor) can be attached to the shaft. As the teeth of the rotating wheel (or other target features) pass by the face of the magnet, the amount of magnetic flux passing through the magnet and consequently the coil varies. When the gear tooth is close to the sensor, the flux is at a maximum. When the tooth is further away, the flux drops off. The moving target results in a time-varying flux that induces a proportional voltage in the coil. Subsequent electronics are then used to process this signal to get a waveform that can be more readily counted and timed. This system has been employed in automotive electronic ignition and ABS braking. By attaching two reluctor rings to a shaft, the torque can be measured. The tooth spacing on reluctor rings may be uniform, or uneven.

== Advantages and disadvantages ==
VR sensors are based on very mature technology, and they offer several significant advantages. The first is low cost - coils of wire and magnets are relatively inexpensive. Unfortunately, the low cost of the transducer is partially offset by the cost of the additional signal-processing circuitry needed to recover a useful signal. And because the magnitude of the signal developed by the VR sensor is proportional to target speed, it is difficult to design circuitry to accommodate very-low-speed signals. A given VR-sensing system has a definite limit as to how slow the target can move and still develop a usable signal. An alternative but more expensive technology is Hall effect sensor. Hall effect sensors are true zero-rpm sensors and actively supply information even when there's no transmission motion at all.

One area in which VR sensors excel, is in high-temperature applications. Because operating temperature is limited by the characteristics of the materials used in the device, with appropriate construction VR sensors can be made to operate at temperatures in excess of 300 °C. An example of such an extreme application is sensing the turbine speed of a jet engine or engine cam shaft and crankshaft position control in an automobile.
