= Planar Hall sensor =

The planar Hall sensor is a type of magnetic sensor based on the planar Hall effect of ferromagnetic materials. It measures the change in anisotropic magnetoresistance caused by an external magnetic field in the Hall geometry. As opposed to an ordinary Hall sensor, which measures field components perpendicular to the sensor plane, the planar Hall sensor responds to magnetic field components in the sensor plane. Generally speaking, for ferromagnetic materials, the resistance is larger when the current flows along the direction of magnetization than when it flows perpendicular to the magnetization vector. This creates an asymmetric electric field perpendicular to the current, which depends on the magnetization state of the sensor. Exactly controlling the magnetization state is the key to the operation of the planar Hall sensor. From fabrication the magnetization is confined to one certain direction in zero applied field, and the application of a field perpendicular to this direction changes the magnetization state in such a way that the electronic readout is linear with respect to the magnitude of the applied field. This is true for applied fields smaller than a fourth of the intrinsic effective anisotropy field (see ref. 1 for details on the working principle).

The planar Hall sensor has been demonstrated as a magnetic bead detector and to measure the Earth's field with nanotesla precision As a magnetic bead sensor, the planar Hall sensor can be used as sensing principle in a magnetic bioassay. In ref. 5 detection of influenza virusses was demonstrated using an immunoassay imitating a sandwich ELISA based on monoclonal antibodies.
