= Quartz thermometer =

High accuracy thermometer

The quartz thermometer is a high-precision, high accuracy temperature sensor. It measures temperature by measuring the frequency of a quartz crystal oscillator. The oscillator contains a specially cut crystal that results in a linear temperature coefficient of frequency, so the measurement of the temperature is essentially reduced to measurement of the oscillator frequency. Resolutions of .0001 °C, and accuracy of .02 °C from 0-100 °C are achievable. The high linearity makes it possible to achieve high accuracy over an important temperature range that contains only one convenient temperature reference point for calibration, the triple point of water.

Introduced by Hewlett-Packard in 1965, the successor company, Agilent, has discontinued the Model 2804A Quartz Thermometer. Other manufacturers make nearly linear-in-temperature quartz crystals that may be used to construct thermometers of similar performance.
