= Triangulation sensor =

Optical Triangulation Sensors are commonly used to provide door mounted safety detection on swinging automatic doors. These types of sensors are common in North America. When automatic swinging doors open and close, it is important that they do not come into contact with pedestrians passing through the door.

== Classification ==
Sensors used in the automatic door industry typically fall into four categories:

1. Microwave sensors used to detect motion of a person as they approach an automatic door,
2. Reflective optical sensors that are mounted on the door header, and detect the presence of a person in the door path
3. Camera based sensors that are also mounted on the door header and similarly detect presence; and
4. Triangulation sensors which are mounted on the door and move with the door to provide safety.

Reflective and camera technologies do not perform well on moving swing doors, because they typically depend upon detection of changes in the background. A sensor mounted on a swing door system is constantly in motion, so the background (i.e. floor beneath the door) changes continuously. A triangulation sensor overcomes this problem.

== Functionality ==
In most cases, an optical triangulation sensor is mounted near the top of the swinging door frame, inside a long extruded aluminum tube with an optical window facing the floor. An 880 nm LED light source emits a collimated, near-infrared light beam. The beam bounces off the floor and is received by a photodiode positioned adjacent to the LED source. A second photodiode (or a linear array of photodiodes) is positioned further along the length of the sensor.

When the emitted beam bounces off the floor, the reflected energy is almost exclusively concentrated on the first adjacent photodiode. When a human or object moves into the optical path, the reflected beam bounces back from the object. Since the beam is no longer traveling the full optical path length to the floor, its reflected angle changes. One of the adjacent photodiodes then receives the optical energy and the sensor responds by sending a signal to the automatic door controller. At that point the door stops, slows or reverses, hence averting a collision and providing safety.

Triangulation sensors are found on a number of door brands, and manufactured by several sensor manufacturers. One example is the SuperScan-II from BEA. Other products from different manufacturers are also available.

== See also ==
- Intentional radiator

== Safety standards ==
- DIN 18650 Automatic Door Standard (Germany)
- ANSI A156.10-2005 standard for U.S. Automatic Pedestrian Doors
