= Leaf sensor =

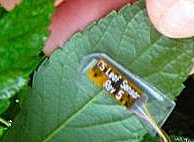
AgriHouse Smart Leaf Sensor (SG-1000)

A leaf sensor is a phytometric device (measurement of plant physiological processes) that measures water loss or the water deficit stress (WDS) in plants by real-time monitoring the moisture level in plant leaves. An early leaf sensor was developed by LeafSens, an Israeli company granted a US patent for a mechanical leaf thickness sensing device in 2001. LeafSen has made strides incorporating their leaf sensory technology into citrus orchards in Israel. A solid state smart leaf sensor technology was developed by the University of Colorado at Boulder for NASA in 2007. It was designed to help monitor and control agricultural water demand. AgriHouse received a National Science Foundation (NSF) STTR grant in conjunction with the University of Colorado to further develop the solid state leaf sensor technology for precision irrigation control in 2007.

== Precision monitoring ==
=== Water deficit stress measurements ===
A Phase I research grant from the National Science Foundation in 2007 showed that the leaf sensor technology has the potential to save between 30% and 50% of irrigation water by reducing irrigation from once every 24 hours to about every 2 to 2.5 days by sensing impending water deficit stress. Leaf sensor technology developed by AgriHouse indicates water deficit stress by measuring the turgor pressure of a leaf, which decreases dramatically at the onset of leaf dehydration. Early detection of impending water deficit stress in plants can be used as an input parameter for precision irrigation control by allowing plants to communicate water requirements directly to humans and/or electronic interfaces. For example, a base system utilizing the wirelessly transmitted information of several sensors appropriately distributed over various sectors of a round field irrigated by a center-pivot irrigation system could tell the irrigation lever exactly when and what field sector needs to be irrigated.

=== Irrigation control ===
In a 2008 USDA sponsored field study AgriHouse's SG-1000 Leaf Sensor attached to dry beans demonstrated a 25% savings of irrigation water and pumping cost. In 2010 the University of Colorado, Boulder, Colorado granted AgriHouse Inc an exclusive license of its patented leaf sensor technology.

Precision irrigation monitoring using the SG-1000 leaf sensor and commercial data loggers for irrigation control has been achieved in recent years. Researchers have found a direct correlation between leaf thickness and Relative Water Content (RWC) of plant leaves using the SG-1000 Leaf Sensor under field conditions.

=== Water and Energy Conservation ===
The agriculture sustainability benefits of water and energy savings have been established using the SG-1000 leaf sensor under field conditions and in greenhouses. Plant science researchers and agronomists have utilized the SG-1000 Leaf Sensor for studying the relationship between water content and leaf cell turgidity potential and leaf thickness. Plant leaf characteristics including water potential and osmotic water potential relationships have been studied with the device.

== See also ==
- Aeroponics
- Agronomy
- Conservation
- Hydroponics
- Irrigation
- Plant physiology
- Plant science
- Turgor pressure
