= Hook gauge evaporimeter =

Instrument used to measure amount of water evaporated

A Hook gauge evaporimeter is a precision instrument used to measure changes in water levels due to evaporation. It is used to precisely measure the level of a free water surface as an evaporation pan or a tank. The main users are meteorologists and water engineers, especially in hot, arid countries where water conservation is of vital importance.

== Description ==
The device consists of a sharp hook suspended from a micrometer cylinder, with the body of the device having arms which rest on the rim of a still well inside the pan. The still well serves to isolate the device from any ripples that might be present in the sample being measured, while allowing the water level to equalize. The measurement is taken by turning the knob to lower the hook through the surface of the water until capillary action causes a small depression to form around the tip of the hook. The knob is then turned slowly until the depression "pops," with the measurement showing on the micrometer scale.

== Use ==
Evaporation rate is determined by a sequence of measurements over a set time interval, usually every 24 hours.

== See also ==
- Atmometer
