= Electrochemical fatigue crack sensor =

An Electrochemical Fatigue Crack Sensor (EFCS) is a type of low cost electrochemical nondestructive dynamic testing method used primarily in the aerospace and transportation infrastructure industries. The method is used to locate surface-breaking and slightly subsurface defects in all metallic materials. In bridge structures, EFCS is used at known fatigue susceptible areas, such as sharp-angled coped beams, stringer to beam attachments, and the toe of welds. This dynamic testing can be a form of short term or long-term monitoring, as long as the structure is undergoing dynamic cyclic loading.

== History ==
The Electrochemical Fatigue Crack Sensor.

In 1992, Dr. Campbell Laird and Dr. Yuanfeng Li invented the EFS™. The EFS™ relies on a patented electrical test method, which monitors the current flow at the surface of a metal while it is being mechanically flexed. The output current resembles a heart’s EKG pattern and can be interpreted to indicate the degree of fatigue as well as the presence of cracks in their earliest stages of development. The technology behind EFS was devised by researchers from the U.S. Air Force and the University of Pennsylvania for use in the aerospace industry. The original research was aimed at developing a technology for detecting problem cracks in airframes and engines. Since that time, additional research and development has resulted in the adaptation of the EFS system for steel bridge inspection.

== Principles ==
The Electrochemical Fatigue Sensor (EFS) is a nondestructive crack dynamic inspection technology, similar in concept to a medical EKG, which is used to determine if actively growing fatigue cracks are present. An EFS sensor is first applied to the fatigue sensitive location on the bridge or metal structure, and then is injected with an electrolyte, at which point a small voltage is applied. The system subsequently monitors changes in the current response that results from the exposure of fresh steel during crack propagation. The EFS system consists of an electrolyte, a sensor array and a modified potentiostat call the potentiostat data link (PDL) for applying a constant polarizing voltage between the bridge and sensor, as well as data collection and analysis software.

The current response from the sensor array, which consists of a crack measurement sensor and a reference sensor, are collected, analyzed and compared with the system software. Data is presented in both the time domain and the frequency domain. An algorithm, specifically written for this system, automatically indicates the level of fatigue crack activity at the inspection location. EFS can detect cracks in the field as small as 0.01 inches in an actual structure (too small to be seen with the unaided eye).

== Materials ==
The original research for the EFS was aimed at developing a technology for detecting problem cracks in airframes and engines.

Grade 5, also known as Ti6Al4V, Ti-6Al-4V, or Ti 6-4, is the most commonly used titanium alloy in the aerospace industry, such as internal combustion engine connecting rods. It features a chemical composition of 6% aluminium, 4% vanadium, 0.25% (maximum) iron, 0.2% (maximum) oxygen, and the remainder titanium. and the remaining portion titanium. Notably, Grade 5 is considerably stronger than commercially pure titanium, while sharing the same stiffness and thermal properties (excluding thermal conductivity, which is approximately 60% lower in Grade 5 Ti than in CP Ti). One of its notable advantages is its heat treatable. This grade exhibits an exceptional combination of strength, corrosion resistance, weldability, and fabricability. Typically, it finds application in uses up to temperatures of 400 degrees Celsius.

(Grade 5 has a density of approximately 4420 kg/m3, Young's modulus of 110 GPa, and tensile strength of 1000 MPa. By comparison, annealed type 316 stainless steel has a density of 8000 kg/m3, modulus of 193 GPa, and tensile strength of only 570 MPa and tempered 6061 aluminum alloy has a density of 2700 kg/m3, modulus of 69 GPa, and tensile strength of 310 MPa). EFS detects growing cracks in steel, aluminum, titanium alloys, and other metals.

== Inspection steps ==
Below are the main steps of using Electrochemical Fatigue Sensors on a bridge:

1. Identification of Critical Areas:

To use the EFS on bridges, inspectors first identify the vulnerable parts of a bridge. These could be the areas most susceptible to wear and tear, such as sharp-angled coped beams, stringer to beam attachments, or the toe of welds. It could also be locations where bridge owners already suspect a crack.

2. Installation of Sensors:

The area to be monitored should be clean and free of any loose material. (The paint does not have to be totally removed as in other sensor installations.) The inspectors wire up the areas with sensors, which are similar to the peel-and-stick versions used for an EKG reading. The sensor array consists of a crack measurement sensor and a reference sensor.

3. Apply a Constant Current:

The sensors are injected with an electrolyte liquid which facilitates the applied constant electric current between the sensors and the bridge.

4. Monitoring:

The system monitors changes in the current response that results from the exposure of fresh steel during crack propagation.

5. Interpretation of Data:

The current response from the sensor array indicates quickly and clearly, whether a growing crack exists at the inspection location. And because the device is operated while the bridge is in use, it can determine how the cracks change as the structure flexes under stress. Data is presented in both the time domain and the frequency domain. An algorithm, specifically written for this system, automatically indicates the level of fatigue crack activity at the inspection location. The system can detect cracks in the field as small as 0.01 inches in an actual structure.

== See also ==
- Nondestructive testing
