= Fluorescent chloride sensor =

Fluorescent chloride sensors are used for chemical analysis. The discoveries of chloride (Cl^{−}) participations in physiological processes stimulates the measurements of intracellular Cl^{−} in live cells and the development of fluorescent tools referred below.

== Quinoline-based dyes ==
quinolinium - based Cl^{−} indicators are based on the capability of halides to quench the fluorescence of heterocyclic organic compounds with quaternary nitrogen. Fluorescence is quenched by a collision mechanism with a linear Stern–Volmer relationship:

$\frac{F_0}{F} = 1 + K([Cl^-])$

where:
$F_0$ is the fluorescence in the absence of halide
$F$ is the fluorescence in the presence of halide
$K$ is the Stern–Volmer quenching constant, which depends on the chloride concentration, $[Cl^-]$. in a linear manner.

Thus, quinoline-based indicators are one-wavelength dyes - the signal results from monitoring the fluorescence at a single wavelength. Ratiometric measurement of halide concentration is not possible with quinolinium dyes. The kinetics of collision quenching are diffusion-limited only, and these indicators provide submillisecond time resolution. Quinolinium-based dyes are insensitive to physiological changes in pH, but they are prone to strong bleaching and demand ultraviolet excitation, which is harmful for living organisms. Because quinolinium is not occurring in the cells naturally, cell loading is necessary. However, quinolinium-based dyes aren't retained perfectly in the cell and can't be targeted easily to subcellular organelles. Also, they cannot be designed specific to a certain type of cell.

The most used quinolinium-based Cl^{−} indicators are 6-methoxy-1-(3-sulfonatopropyl) quinolinium (SPQ), 6-methoxy-N-ethylquinolium Cl^{−} (MEQ), and N-(6-methoxyquinolyl)-acetoethyl ester (MQAE).

== YFP based Cl^{−} sensors ==
Cl^{−}indicators can be designed on the basis of endogenously expressed fluorescent proteins such as Yellow fluorescent protein (YFP). An advantage of endogenously expressed probes over dye-based probes is their ability to achieve cell-type-specificity by the choice of Promoter (genetics) promotor. YFP based indicators are mutated forms of Green fluorescent protein (GFP). YFP contains four point mutations and has a red-shifted excitation and emission spectrum compared with GFP. YFP fluorescence is sensitive to various small anions with relative potencies iodine > nitrate > chloride > bromide > formate > acetate. YFP sensitivity to these small anions results from ground-state binding near the chromophore, which apparently alters the chromophore ionization constant and hence the fluorescence emission. The fluorescence of YFP is sensitive to [Cl^{−} ] and pH. The effect is fully reversible.

YFP is excited at visible range and is a genetically encoded probe. YFP based Cl^{−} sensors have rather low kinetics of Cl^{−} association / dissociation. The half time association/dissociation constants for YFP mutant range from 50 ms (YFP-H148Q I152L) to 2 sec (YFP-H148Q V163S). If a fluorescent indicators is based on one fluorescent protein only, it doesn't allow for ratiometric measurements. Hence, a rationale for ratiometric fluorescent indicators results.

== FRET-based, genetically encoded Cl^{−} indicators ==
Förster resonance energy transfer (FRET)-based Cl indicators consist of two fluorescent proteins, Cyan fluorescent protein (CFP) and YFP connected via a polypeptide linker. This allows ratiometric Cl^{−} measurements based on the Cl^{−} sensitivity of YFP and Cl^{−} insensivity of CFP. Clomeleon and Cl^{−} Sensor are FRET-based Cl indicators that allow ratiometric non-invasive monitoring of chloride activity in living cells.
