= Nano-tetherball sensor =

Method of glucose detection

The nano-tetherball sensor is one of newly discovered methods in detecting glucose in the human body. The nano-tetherball sensor for glucose has attracted attention of diabetic medical community due to its methods and high sensitivity in performance. The machine’s name comes from the fact that its design is similar to a small cube-shaped tetherball. Nano machines have been in the biosensor industry for more than two decades, and they have performed a number of different beneficial roles for diabetic patients. Despite the many opto/electronic mechanisms on the market, from a physical and chemical point of view, the nanomachine optical fiber provides many advantages over the other types.

These advantages include its remote in-situ or actual detection; its wavelength has the highest degree of selectivity, with high information competence and analysis with multi-channels of wide capacity for detecting reagents that are non-responsive in electrical structures. The cubes rely on the tetherball structure and involve manipulation of tiny amounts of lasers in micro-channel using Nano-tetherballs. The Nano-tetherball process has the potential of being the most reliable in the accumulation of information. Medical statements that emphasize how the machine compares with other digital data storage and retrieval processes, to determine exactly how effective the machine is with processing the data detected and how to use said data. The information collected will be helpful for the formulation of treatments which are more practical than other digital bio-optical machines provide.

== Model ==
This fresh biosensor is more responsive than others in two very significant roles; glucose sensors need at least six times more glucose to produce an indicator, and the original sensor can gather an overindulgence of a wider variety of glucose application, meaning it can be used for number of functions. Much work has gone into developing the optimal electrode configuration to match biosensing needs. This structure is at times further functionalized to complete the biosensor fabrication process. A multi-wall platinum substrate, subsequently functionalized by oxidation, helps to allow the effectivity on the control of the glucose oxidase enzymes. The open ends of nanotubes, which are carboxylated (CNT), are used for the control of the enzymes and signaling detection monitor by the platinum substrate which gives the actual transduction platform. This glucose oxidase functionalized MWNT biosensor was used to detect various amounts of glucose. In devices such as these the CNTs play a dual role a substrate to attach biologically significant molecules and as the transducer component of the biosensor.
