= Electromechanical film =

Electromechanical Film (EMFI, EMFIT, trademarks of Emfit Ltd) is a thin, flexible film that can function as a sensor or actuator. It is composed of a charged polymer coated with two conductive layers, making it an electret. It was invented and first made by Finnish inventor Kari Kirjavainen. Its voided internal structure and high resistivity allow it to hold a high electric charge and make the film very sensitive to force. Changes in the film's thickness create an electric charge and make it operate as a sensor, or when an electric voltage is applied, it can function as an actuator. This gives the film applications in different fields of technology, including, but not limited to, mechanical vibration and ultrasound sensors, microphones, loudspeaker panels, keyboards, and physiological touch sensors. Other than being cheap, its main advantage is its versatility; it can be cut, reshaped, and resized depending on its surface of application.

== Manufacturing and structure ==
The base film is first made from bi-axially orienting a polypropylene film. It is created through a "film-blowing" process, in which the plastic is extruded using a film blowing machine in the shape of a tube. Through the process of foaming, gaseous bubbles can be formed at a fixed density in the tube, which would give rise to EMFi's "voided internal structure". It is then expanded into two different directions depending on the desired thickness and orientation (bi-axial orientation). The tube is then coated with some electrically conductive material and then cut open into a film. This film is then charged using the Corona Treatment, and the electrically conductive layers create electrodes.

EMFiT sensor has three layers, two of which that are homogeneous and act as electrodes as mentioned above, and a middle layer that is filled with flat, disk-shaped voids. Upon receiving charge from the Corona method, electrical breakdowns occur and the surfaces of the voids are permanently charged. There is one basic type of EMFFIT sensor film manufactured currently, the thicknesses being 70 μm respectively.

== Operation ==
=== Sensor ===
The film can be used as a sensor. As the film is charged, it creates an electric field. When pressure is applied to the film, the film's thickness is reduced and changes in the shapes of the individual voids in its structure occur. Any electric charges residing in these voids will move and create mirror charges at the electrode surfaces of the film. These charges are proportional to the force applied to the film, which is given by the equation:

Δq = kΔF

where ΔF is the dynamic force, Δq is the charge generated, and k is the sensitivity factor.

=== Actuator ===
The same sensor film can also be used as an actuator. Changes in thickness can be induced by applying a voltage on the film; compression and expansion of the film depends on the polarity of the voltage, and it occurs when both the outer surfaces of the film either attract or repel from each other. The attractive force between the surfaces while the film is uncharged is given by the equation:

F = 12CU^{2}x

where C is the capacitance of the film and x is the film's thickness.

== Applications ==
EMFIT sensor film has a diverse range of applications due to it being flexible, durable, and sensitive to a wide range of frequencies. These properties are attributed to its base material: cellular voided Ferro-electret film. Due to these properties, in conjunction with the two modes of operation, it has already seen use in vandalism-proof keyboards, guitar pickups, flat speakers, and vital signs ballistocardiography sensors. esmicrophones.

- In active noise cancellation, a part of a sensor product can be used in the sensor mode to identify sound signals, and a part can be used as an actuator and then be used to produce sound signals that cancel out the first.
- EMFIT sensors has been implemented in physiological bio-signal sensors where no direct contact with the skin is required, such as a BCG, as its application is non-invasive.

== Limits ==
Due to the thermal constraints faced by using polypropylene as base material, applications where high sensitivity is needed, long-term temperatures should be below 70 °C, which limits its scope in terms of some potential applications such as the automotive industry.

The air voids present in the structure become smaller and higher in pressure as force is applied to the film. This means that the film becomes harder to compress as it goes under more load, meaning that in the sensor mode, the charge output is non-linear, which can make calibrating the sensor difficult.
