= Permanent downhole gauge =

A permanent downhole gauge (PDG) is a pressure and/or temperature gauge permanently installed in an oil or gas well. These gauges are typically installed in the tubing in the well and can measure the tubing pressure, annulus pressure, or both. Systems installed in well casing to read formation pressure directly, suspended systems, and systems built in coil (continuous) tubing are also available. The data that PDGs provide are useful to reservoir engineers in determining the quantities of oil or gas contained below the Earth's surface in an oil or gas reservoir and also which method of production is best.

Permanent downhole gauges are installed in oil wells and gas wells for the purposes of observation and optimization. Downhole gauges primarily monitor pressure at a single point or multiple points in a well, and may secondarily monitor temperature. These gauges may use additional sensors to measure additional environmental variables:

- pressure;
- temperature;
- distributive temperature;
- noise;
- strain; and
- flow.

The information provided by permanently mounted sensors, combined with remotely controlled valves, can enable "smart" or "intelligent" well design. A "smart well" is a well that can monitor information and make adjustments automatically with the goal of optimizing production and/or product recovery.
