= Exhaust gas temperature gauge =

Meter used to monitor exhaust gas temperature

An exhaust gas temperature gauge (EGT gauge or EGT sensor) is a meter used to monitor the exhaust gas temperature of an internal combustion engine in conjunction with a thermocouple-type pyrometer. EGT gauges are found in certain cars and aircraft. By monitoring EGT, the driver or pilot can get an idea of the vehicle's air-fuel ratio (AFR).

At a stoichiometric air-fuel ratio, the exhaust gas temperature is different from that in a lean or rich air-fuel ratio. At rich air-fuel ratio, the exhaust gas temperature either increases or decreases depending on the fuel. High temperatures (typically above 1,600 °F or 900 °C) can be an indicator of dangerous conditions that can lead to catastrophic engine failure.

== Applications ==
- Most light piston aircraft still have manual mixture controls, and pilots use an EGT gauge to set the optimal fuel-air mixture for their current density altitude and power. The hottest cylinder-head temperatures (CHT) and highest internal cylinder pressures occur around 50 °F (10 °C) rich of peak EGT, and risk predetonation, making it essential to avoid that range, and operate either lean of peak EGT or richer than 100 °F (38 °C) rich of peak EGT. Leaner mixtures result in significant fuel savings, but may result in rough operation of some carbureted or poorly-tuned fuel-injected engines. Jet aircraft used EGT gauges which were monitored by the flight engineer during engine startup and throughout the whole flight. EGT gauges were then implemented into the interfaces of EICAS and ECAM in glass cockpits.
- EGT meters are used for tuning turbo-equipped cars. If the sensor is installed at the manifold collector before the turbo, the turbine inlet temperature can be monitored. If the sensor is installed after the turbo, the exhaust temperature can be monitored. Because EGT typically drops 200–300 °F (93–149 °C) across the turbine, installers try to put the thermocouple as close to the cylinder head as possible to give a true reading, and a reading that will react faster to the engine's condition compared to an installation after the turbo.
- Air-cooled engines, like used in Volkswagen, Porsche and other cars can be damaged by over heating. An exhaust gas temperature gauge can be used to prevent damage.
- Air-cooled motorcycle engines also can be damaged by over heating.

== Oxygen sensor ==
Using an EGT meter alone is considered an older technique for getting the most out of petrol and diesel engines, as gauge-type wideband digital oxygen sensors are similarly priced. However, some advanced racers will use EGT gauges in combination with a wideband oxygen sensor to lean the fuel ratio a bit to safely raise the temperature for more power.

== Advanced tuning ==
Though by tuning primarily by EGT and air fuel ratio values, EGT is still to this day a used data output for engine tuning. When fine tuning an engine, if possible with the ECU manipulation with the cylinder's timing can be made. By adjusting the timing, the resultant cylinder temperature can be used to improve cylinder efficiency. Though this is still widely done, EGT values should be used as a safe guard sensor measure and as a tuning guide.
