= Long-Range Reconnaissance and Observation System =

Long-Range Reconnaissance and Observation System or LORROS is a sensor system developed by Elbit Systems to provide long-range daytime and night-time surveillance. The unit consists of Forward looking infrared (FLIR) and Charge-coupled device (CCD) image sensors. Optional components include eyesafe laser rangefinder, built-in compass and inclinometer, which provide UTM location mapping. The unit can be operated remotely with a control unit for up to 150 meters, which can be extended to several kilometers using fiber link.

The sensor unit comes with a tripod; it can also be mounted on vehicles or installed on towers. LORROS is one of the sensor components selected for the initial phase of SBInet program of United States Department of Homeland Security.
