= Time pressure gauge =

A time pressure gauge is an instrument that digitally displays pressure data divided into appropriate time intervals. While a pressure gauge indicates a general unit amount, only a time pressure gauge accounts for varying consumption and capacity in relation to time remaining.

== Applications ==
Welders using oxygen and acetylene can plan more efficiently if they know the energy duration due to varying consumption in cutting techniques. A nurse concerned that a patient may run out of oxygen can monitor the workload more efficiently by knowing how much time is remaining rather that how much pressure is left.

Scuba divers could determine the length of time they could remain submerged. A pilot could manage supplemental oxygen flow rates of an aircraft to determine possible altitudes for maximizing fuel efficiency. Ultimately any activity that uses pressurized contents is applicable.

== Safety ==
Using a time pressure gauge is also very valuable in dangerous scenarios. Imagine a firefighter inside of a burning building contemplating returning for oxygen or pressing further to the next room. He or she could understand both the time currently remaining, as well as time remaining if they altered their breathing pattern.

A pilot could determine oxygen time remaining for descent in the event of a decompression. This information is highly important considering the multiple contingencies that arise in daily air travel (i.e. – consumption rates of oxygen per minute include multiple variables such as number of passengers and individual consumption rates).

== Reducing carbon footprint ==
The use of a time pressure gauge provides for better planning with any instrument that emits carbon gas through varying consumption rates determined by pressurized contents. Efficiency is maximized by understanding energy requirements in time. One such example would be something as simple as a gas grill. Operation of a gas grill with all burners on can observe tangible results (time reduction) by turning the gas control to low or by shutting off one burner. Seeing the increase in time will automatically indicate an increase in energy saving. Most notably the time pressure gauge could reduce carbon emissions in all air travel through increased fuel efficiency, while also reducing fuel cost. Furthermore, recently the airline industry is under pressure to reduce carbon emissions globally, and instruments such as the time pressure gauge could spearhead this movement.

== Current software technology ==
Time pressure gauge technology is relatively new, and not fully in widespread use. However, the software technology it uses is more integrated. A comprehensive oxygen planning program developed by Aeronautical Data Systems Inc. for the airline industry exists and is in use with over 20 corporate flight departments.
