= Morphix Chameleon =

The Morphix Chameleon is a portable chemical detection device. It consists of a reusable armband, wearable over many hazardous material suits, on which removable sensors are mounted. The sensors have color-changing tags that indicate the presence of hazardous or dangerous chemicals in the air, allowing personnel in the field to make decisions about dangerous situations.

== Development ==
The Chameleon was developed by Morphix Technologies during the early 2000s. Morphix Technologies won a Small Business Development and Research grant in 2002 to design a device that could indicate the presence of dangerous gasses or vapors cheaply, easily, and quickly. The design for the armband came from requests from the military, who needed it to be unobtrusive. In contrast, the replaceable sensor part (cassette) came from a need to keep it affordable for police and emergency responders.

== Benefits ==
The Chameleon can be used in high temperatures, arctic cold, in the desert, or even after being submerged in water, and still detect up to one part per billion of dangerous air-borne hazards. After opening the sensors, they have a 24-hour lifetime before function begins to be hampered.

== Components ==
=== The armband ===
The Chameleon’s lightweight and unobtrusive armband has room for ten of the eleven sensor cassettes that are currently produced and can easily swap out used sensors for quick replacements. It was designed with military and emergency situations in mind. It can be easily put on or taken off, with enough adjustment to be able to fit easily over even the highest level of hazardous material protective gear.

=== The sensors ===
The Chameleon sensors function similarly to litmus paper. The cassettes that hold the sensors are mounted onto the armband and can be easily removed. The cassettes have a small viewing window that shows a uniform colored surface when not exposed to its particular trigger. Once exposed to it, half of the viewing window will change color, presenting a contrast that allows users to recognize that a threat is present.

The sensors detect acidic and basic gases, ammonia, chlorine/fluorine, diborane, hydrazine, hydrogen sulfide, iodine, phosgene, phosphine, and sulfur dioxide. After opening, they retain functionality for up to twenty-four hours. The sensors come packaged in groups that allow them to change out easily depending on the scenario. These groups are Chemical Suicide, Clan-Meth Lab, and Haz-Mat detection, which are the most common configurations used.

== Uses ==
- Chemical Suicide—the combining of common household chemicals to create a toxic gas as a suicide method—is not only a danger to the person attempting the suicide but also to others in the vicinity or police responding to the scene.
- Methamphetamine production can release toxic gas when done incorrectly, and police need to be informed before they put themselves in danger.
- Emergency crews and first responders use the Chameleon when arriving at sites of industrial accidents when they do not know the extent of damage or dangers present.

In addition to being worn directly, the idea exists of mounting the Chameleon onto aerial or ground Drones to further extend its utility in certain situations.

The Chameleon won the 2007 Innovation Awards from Law Enforcement Product News in the category of “Haz-mat/WMD”.
