= Velocity receiver =

Sensor responding to speed of movement

A velocity receiver (also known as a velocity sensor) is a type of sensor that responds to the speed of movement, rather than absolute position. These sensors detect the rate of change in position, generating output signals that vary based on the speed of motion. Velocity receivers are essential in fields where precise control of speed is required, such as in audio recording, musical instruments, and industrial applications.

== Principles of Operation ==
Velocity receivers operate on the principle of measuring the relative speed between two components or points within the sensor. This measurement is often achieved through electromagnetic or piezoelectric methods, depending on the type of velocity receiver. The generated signal is typically proportional to the velocity of movement, providing real-time feedback for various applications.

== Types of Velocity Receivers ==
There are two primary types of velocity receivers: moving coil and piezoelectric. Each type has unique characteristics and uses.

- Moving Coil Velocity Receivers: This type of sensor contains a coil supported by springs within a stationary magnetic field. When movement occurs, the coil moves within the magnetic field, generating a voltage that is directly proportional to the velocity of movement. Moving coil velocity receivers are commonly used in applications where a self-generating signal is advantageous, as they typically do not require external amplification.
- Piezoelectric Velocity Receivers: These sensors are based on the piezoelectric effect, where certain materials generate an electric charge in response to mechanical stress. In a piezoelectric velocity receiver, the generated output is proportional to the velocity, rather than the force or displacement. Due to the relatively low output signal, piezoelectric sensors often require amplification. They are preferred in high-frequency applications, such as vibration analysis.

== Comparison with Position and Acceleration Sensors ==
Velocity receivers differ from position and acceleration sensors in terms of what they measure and how they are used. Position sensors measure the location of an object, while acceleration sensors measure the rate of change of velocity. Velocity sensors provide real-time speed information, often used to track or control movement accurately. This capability makes them valuable in applications where speed monitoring is more critical than position or acceleration.

== Applications ==
Velocity receivers have a wide range of applications, from audio technology to industrial machinery.

- Audio Technology: Dynamic microphones function as velocity receivers by responding to the speed of air movement caused by sound waves. This technology allows for high-fidelity sound capture by emphasizing sound dynamics based on velocity.
- Electronic Keyboards: Many modern electronic keyboards are equipped with velocity-sensitive keys that provide expressive control over the sound. In these keyboards, velocity sensors measure the speed of each keypress, allowing the volume or timbre to vary based on how quickly or forcefully a key is pressed. This feature enhances musical expression, making it a crucial component in digital pianos and synthesizers.
- Vibration Monitoring and Analysis: In industrial settings, velocity sensors are used to monitor machinery vibrations. By tracking the speed of vibrations, these sensors can provide early warnings of potential mechanical failures, enabling preventive maintenance. Piezoelectric velocity receivers are especially suitable for this purpose due to their high-frequency response and sensitivity.

== Notable Examples ==
- Dynamic Microphones: As a common example of a velocity receiver, dynamic microphones use a moving coil that interacts with a magnetic field to generate an electrical signal based on the velocity of air particles. This type of microphone is widely used in live sound applications due to its durability and ability to handle high sound pressure levels.
- Accelerometers in Automotive and Aerospace Industries: Velocity sensors are used in accelerometers within automotive and aerospace industries to monitor and control systems based on real-time speed and movement data. These sensors help ensure stability, safety, and performance in various systems, such as stability control and engine monitoring.

== Advantages and Limitations ==
=== Advantages ===
- Velocity receivers are generally more straightforward to implement than position sensors in applications where only speed measurement is needed.
- Moving coil velocity sensors can operate without an external power source, which is beneficial for applications requiring a self-sufficient sensor.
- Piezoelectric velocity receivers offer high sensitivity and frequency response, making them ideal for detecting small, rapid movements in precision applications.

=== Limitations ===
- Piezoelectric velocity receivers typically require an amplifier due to the small electrical signal generated, adding complexity and potential points of failure.
- Moving coil velocity receivers may be prone to inaccuracies at very low speeds, where the generated signal becomes weaker.
