= Position sensitive device =

A position sensitive device and/or position sensitive detector (PSD) is an optical position sensor (OPS) that can measure a position of a light spot in one or two-dimensions on a sensor surface.

== Principles ==
PSDs can be divided into two classes which work according to different principles: In the first class, the sensors have an isotropic sensor surface that supplies continuous position data. The second class has discrete sensors in an raster-like structure on the sensor surface that supply local discrete data.

=== Isotropic Sensors ===
Design of a PSD using a PIN diode

The technical term PSD was first used in a 1957 publication by J.T. Wallmark for lateral photoelectric effect used for local measurements. On a laminar semiconductor, a so-called PIN diode is exposed to a tiny spot of light. This exposure causes a change in local resistance and thus electron flow in four electrodes. From the currents $I_a$, $I_b$, $I_c$ and $I_d$ in the electrodes, the location of the light spot is computed using the following equations.

$$x = k_x \cdot \frac{I_b - I_d}{I_b + I_d}$$

and

$$y = k_y \cdot \frac{I_a - I_c}{I_a + I_c}$$

The $k_x$ and $k_y$ are simple scaling factors, which permit transformation into coordinates.

An advantage of this process is the continuous measurement of the light spot position with measuring rates up to over 100 kHz. The dependence of local measurement on form and size of the light spot as well as the nonlinear connection are a disadvantage that can be partly compensated by special electrode shapes.

==== 2-D tetra-lateral Position Sensitive Device (PSD) ====
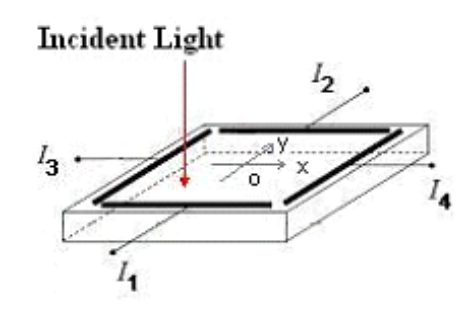
2-D tetra-lateral position sensitive device (PSD)

A 2-D tetra-lateral PSD is capable of providing continuous position measurement of the incident light spot in 2-D. It consists of a single square PIN diode with a resistive layer. When there is an incident light on the active area of the sensor, photocurrents are generated and collected from four electrodes placed along each side of the square near the boundary. The incident light position can be estimated based on currents collected from the electrodes:

$$x = k_x \cdot \frac{I_4 - I_3}{I_4+ I_3}$$

and

$$y = k_y \cdot \frac{I_2 - I_1}{I_2 + I_1}$$

The 2-D tetra-lateral PSD has the advantages of fast response, much lower dark current, easy bias application and lower fabrication cost. Its measurement accuracy and resolution is independent of the spot shape and size unlike the quadrant detector which could be easily changed by air turbulence. However, it suffers from the nonlinearity problem. While the position estimate is approximately linear with respect to the real position when the spot is in the center area of the PSD, the relationship becomes nonlinear when the light spot is away from the center. This seriously limits its applications and there are urgent demands for linearity improvement in many applications.

To reduce the nonlinearity of 2-D PSD, a new set of formulae have been proposed to estimate the incident light position (Song Cui, Yeng Chai Soh：Linearity indices and linearity improvement of 2-D tetra-lateral position sensitive detector. IEEE Transactions on Electron Devices， Vol. 57, No. 9, pp. 2310-2316, 2010):

$$x = k_{x1} \cdot \frac{I_4 - I_3}{I_0 - 1.02(I_2-I_1)} \cdot \frac{0.7(I_2+I_1) + I_0}{I_0 + 1.02(I_2-I_1)}$$

and

$$y = k_{y1} \cdot \frac{I_2 - I_1}{I_0 - 1.02(I_4-I_3)} \cdot \frac{0.7(I_4+I_3) + I_0}{I_0 + 1.02(I_4-I_3)}$$

where :$I_0 = I_1 +I_2 + I_3 + I_4$, and :$k_{x1}, k_{y1}$ are new scale factors.

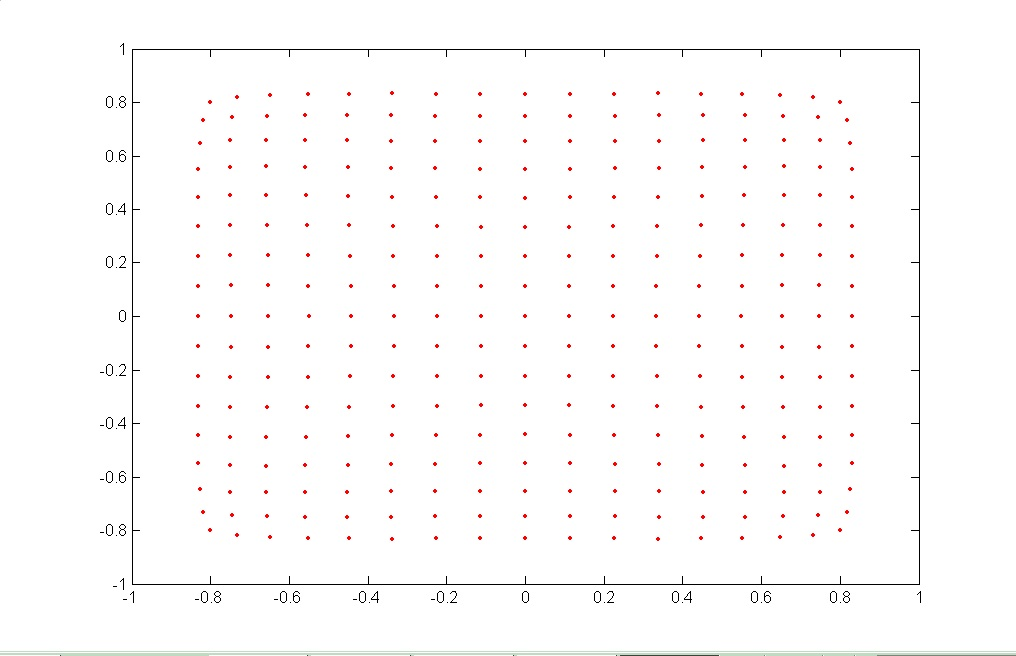
The position response of 2-D tetra-lateral PSD obtained by formulae proposed in S. Cui's paper

The position estimation results obtained by this set of formulae are simulated below. We assume the light spot is moving in steps in both directions and we plot position estimates on a 2-D plane. Thus a regular grid pattern should be obtained if the estimated position is perfectly linear with the true position. The performance is much better than the previous formulae. Detailed simulations and experiment results can be found in S. Cui's paper.

=== Discrete Sensors ===
==== Serial Processing ====
The most common sensor applications with a sampling rate of less than 1000 Hz are CCD or CMOS cameras. The sensor is partitioned into individual pixels whose exposure value can be read out sequentially. The position of the light spot can be computed with the methods of photogrammetry directly from the brightness distribution.

==== Parallel Processing ====
Design of a discrete PSD from Massari with parallel processing. The yellow circle is the illuminated spot.

For faster applications, matrix sensors with parallel processing were developed. Both line by line and in columns, the density of light of each pixel is compared with a global threshold value. The results of comparison become lines and columns with logical OR links. From all columns and all lines the one element that is brighter than a given threshold value is the average value of the coordinates computed of the light spot.

== Fabrication of isotropic sensors ==
Various semiconductor structures, including p-n junctions, Schottky barriers, and metal-oxide-semiconductor structures have been utilized in position-sensitive detectors. More recent hybrid structures based on PEDOT:PSS/n-Si heterojunction exhibit ultrahigh sensitivity and excellent linearity. These hybrid configurations also benefit from a straightforward low-temperature fabrication process eliminating the high-temperature and costly process of manufacturing conventional p-n sensors.

== See also ==
- Photodiode
- PIN diode
- Photoelectric effect
