= Displacement measurement =

Displacement measurement is the measurement of changes in directed distance (displacement). Devices measuring displacement are based on displacement sensors, which can be contacting or non-contacting. Some displacement sensors are based on displacement transducers, devices which convert displacement into another form of energy.

Displacement sensors can be used to indirectly measure a number of other quantities, including deformation, distortion, thermal expansion, thickness (normally through the combination of two sensors), vibration, spindle motion, fluid level, strain and mechanical shock.

Displacement sensors exist that can measure displacement on the order of nanometers or smaller.

== Application ==
Displacement receivers can be used to study and observe the stress waves passing through a material after it is struck. This can be used, for example, to assess fire damage in reinforced concrete.

Displacement transducers are often used to measure vibration.

== Types ==
Optical displacement sensors exist, using reflected light to determine distance.

An ultrasonic displacement sensor is a kind of displacement sensor. These measure the distance to targets by emitting high-frequency sound waves and measuring the time they take to return.

Displacement sensors can be made using linear variable differential transformers.

Strain gauges can be used as the base for small displacement transducers on the order of 0 to 10 mm.

In music, certain music keyboards can be considered to measure displacement in the sense that they respond to displacement, rather than velocity (as is more commonly the case).

Examples of displacement-responding sensors include the mechanical action of tracker organs, as well as the force-sensing resistors found in music keyboards that had polyphonic aftertouch capability. Polyphonic aftertouch is no longer a feature of presently manufactured keyboards, but certain older models such as the Roland A50 featured a pressure sensing resistor, similar in principle-of-operation to a carbon microphone, in each key.
