= Position sensor =

A position sensor is a sensor that detects an object's position. A position sensor may indicate the absolute position of the object (its location) or its relative position (displacement) in terms of linear travel, rotational angle or three-dimensional space. Common types of position sensors include the following:

- Capacitive displacement sensor
- Eddy-current sensor
- Hall-effect sensor
- Inductive sensor
- Laser Doppler vibrometer (optical)
- Linear variable differential transformer (LVDT)
- Photodiode array
- Piezo-electric transducer
- Position encoders:
  - Absolute encoder
  - Incremental encoder
  - Linear encoder
  - Rotary encoder
- Potentiometer
- Proximity sensor (optical)
- String potentiometer (also known as a string encoder or cable position transducer)
- Ultrasonic sensor

== See also ==
- List of length, distance, or range measuring devices
- Positioning system

== Literature ==
- David S. Nyce: Linear Position Sensors: Theory and Application, New Jersey, John Wiley & Sons Inc. (2004)
