= Chip 1 Exchange =

German electronic component distributor

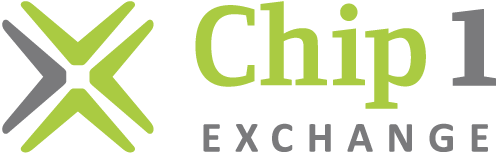
- Type: Privately held
- Industry: Electronics
- Founded: 2001
- Headquarters: Neu-Isenburg
- Key people: Sasan Tabib, CEO; Volkan Sanverdi, CFO; Damon Pouya, COO
- Products: Electronics, electronic components, memory cards, rotary encoders, relays, sensors, switches, semiconductors
- Number of employees: 250+
- Website: www.chip1.com

Chip 1 Exchange is a privately owned electronics company that distributes electronic components. It was founded in 2001 and since then has opened multiple other branches. The company focuses on obsolete and difficult-to-locate components. The company is based in Germany, the United States, Mexico, Brazil, and the Philippines.

== History ==
Chip 1 Exchange was established in 2001, when electronic industry veterans Sasan Tabib, Damon Pouya, and Volkan Sanverdi merged their companies. The name "Chip 1 Exchange" is based on the names of their previous companies: "Chip 1 Technology" and "Fast Line Exchange". Since its inception, Chip 1 Exchange has expanded, opening 6 additional branches.

== Products ==
Chip 1 Exchange has specialized services in relationships with manufacturers, franchised distributors and independent distributors. They also offer a number of standard solutions for inventory management and reduction.

== Locations ==
=== Germany ===
Chip 1 Exchange operates heavily in the European market, and they are active in 45 countries. There is one European warehouse, which 800m² of storage space. As of March 2024, 30,000 items are in stock within the warehouse.

=== United States ===
In April 2007, they began operations in the United States. The US headquarters are in Southern California, and from there manages business for North and South America. Plans for new offices are currently underway, and offices are being built in Texas, Florida and the San Francisco Bay Area.

== Purpose ==
In addition to being an independent distributor of electronic components, Chip 1 Exchange provides services that cater to original equipment manufacturers and electronic manufacturing service companies.

== Certifications ==
Chip 1 Exchange is AS9120B certified, which means that they standardize quality management system requirements. It can be used at all levels of the supply chain by organizations around the world, to improve quality, cost, and delivery performance. This is accomplished through the reduction or elimination of organization-unique requirements, effective implementation of the quality management system, and wider application of good practices.

They are also ESD-DIN certified.

They are ISO 9001:2015 certified

Chip 1 Exchange is certified in International Traffic in Arms Regulations (ITAR), which is a United States regulatory regime to restrict and control the export of defense and military related technologies to safeguard U.S. national security and further U.S. foreign policy objectives.
