= Electric rotating machinery =

Electric rotating machinery includes:

- Electric motor
- Electrical generator
- Motor-generator
- Rotary transformer
