= Digital signal conditioning =

In digital instrumentation system, especially in digital electronics, digital computers have taken a major role in near every aspect of life in our modern world. Digital electronics is at the heart of computers, but there are many direct applications of digital electronics. All these digital electronics need data to be presented to them in a digital format (i.e. the data have to be digitally conditioned). This is called digital conditioning. Since computers are electronics devices, all the information they work with has to be digitally formatted. Therefore, if they are used to control a variable such as temperature, then the temperature has to be represented digitally. That's why we need digital signal conditioning to condition process-control signal to be an approximated digital format.

== Introduction and digital fundamentals ==
Digital signal conditioning in process control means finding a way to represent analog process information in digital format. Use of in control system is particularly valuable number of other reasons, however:

1. A computer can control multivibrator process-control system.
2. Nonlinearities in sensor output can be linearized by the computer.
3. Complicated control equation can be solved quickly and modified as needed.
4. Networking of control computers allow a large process-control complex to operate in a fully integrated fashion.

== Digital information ==
The use of digital techniques in process control system hat process variable measurements and control information be encoded into a digital form. Digital signals themselves are simply two-scale (binary) These levels may be represented in many ways. For example, two volts, two currents, two frequencies etc.

== Digital words ==
Given the simple binary information that is carried by signal digital, it is clear that multiple signals must be used to describe analog information. Generally, this is done by using an assemblage of digital levels to construct a binary number, often called a word. The individual digital levels are referred to as bits of the word. Thus, for example, a 6-bit word consists of six independent digital levels, such as $101011_2$, which can be thought of as a six-digit base 2 number. An important consideration, then, is how the analog information is encoded into this digital word.

== Digital whole numbers ==
One of the most common schemes for encoding analog into s digital words is to use the straight counting of decimal (or base 10) and binary numbers representations.

== Some examples ==
$Ex. 1.$ Find the base 10 equivalent of the binary whole number $00100111_2$ ? Solution. As in the base 10 system, zero preceding the first significant digit do not contribute. Thus, the binary number is actually $100111$, and $n=5$, decimal equivalent can be computed as follows: $N_10 = a_5 2^5 + a_4 2^4 + . . . . + a_1 2^1 + a_0 2^0$ $N_10 = (1)2^5 + (0)2^4+(0)2^3+(1)2^2+(1)2^1+(1)2^0$ $N_10 = 32+4+2+1$ $N_10 = 39$

== See also ==
- Signal conditioning
