= Rotary variable differential transformer =

Type of electrical transformer

A rotary variable differential transformer (RVDT) is a type of electrical transformer used for measuring angular displacement. The transformer has a rotor which can be turned by an external force. The transformer acts as an electromechanical transducer that outputs an alternating current (AC) voltage proportional to the angular displacement of its rotor shaft. An RVDT can be used as a transformer-based sensor for measuring limited-range rotational position, but requires additional electronics for accurate signal processing and integration.

In operation, an alternating current (AC) voltage is applied to the transformer primary to energize the RVDT. When energized with a constant AC voltage, the transfer function (output voltage vs. shaft angular displacement) of any particular RVDT is linear (to within a specified tolerance) over a specified range of angular displacement.

RVDTs employ contactless, electromagnetic coupling, which provides long life and reliable, repeatable position sensing with high resolution, even under extreme operating conditions. Most RVDTs consist of a wound, laminated stator and a salient two-pole rotor. The stator, containing four slots, contains both the primary winding and the two secondary windings, which may be connected together in some cases. RVDTs offer advantages such as sturdiness, relatively low cost, small size, and low sensitivity to temperature, primary voltage and frequency variations.

== Operation ==
Scheme

Characteristics

The two induced voltages of the secondary windings, $V_1$ and $V_2$, vary linearly with the mechanical angle of the rotor, θ:

$$\theta\ = G \cdot\ \left( \frac{V_1 - V_2}{V_1 + V_2} \right)$$

where $G$ is the gain or sensitivity. The second voltage can be determined by:

$$V_2 = V_1 \pm \ G \cdot\ \theta\$$

The difference $V_1 - V_2$ gives a proportional voltage:

$$\Delta\ V = 2 \cdot\ G \cdot\ \theta\$$

and the sum of the voltages is a constant:

$$C= \sum\ V = 2 \cdot\ V_0$$

Consequently, the angular information output by a RVDT is independent of the input voltage, frequency and temperature.

Putting the above mathematical equations in some theoretical form, the working of RVDT can be explained as below.

Basic RVDT construction and operation is provided by rotating an iron-core bearing supported within a housed stator assembly. The housing is passivated stainless steel. The stator consists of a primary excitation coil and a pair of secondary output coils.

A fixed alternating current excitation is applied to the primary stator coil that is electromagnetically coupled to the secondary coils. This coupling is proportional to the angle of the input shaft. The output pair is structured so that one coil is in-phase with the excitation coil, and the second is 180° out-of-phase with the excitation coil.

When the rotor is in a position that directs the available flux equally in both the in-phase and out-of-phase coils, the output voltages cancel and result in a zero value signal. This is referred to as the electrical zero position or E.Z. When the rotor shaft is displaced from E.Z., the resulting output signals have a magnitude and phase relationship proportional to the direction of rotation.

Because RVDTs perform essentially like a transformer, excitation voltages changes will cause directly proportional changes to the output (transformation ratio). However, the voltage out to excitation voltage ratio will remain constant. Since most RVDT signal conditioning systems measure signal as a function of the transformation ratio (TR), excitation voltage drift beyond 7.5% typically has no effect on sensor accuracy and strict voltage regulation is not typically necessary. Excitation frequency should be controlled within ±1% to maintain accuracy.

Although the RVDT can theoretically operate between ±45°, accuracy decreases quickly after ±35°. Thus, its operational limits lie mostly within ±30°, but some up to ±40°. Certain types can operate up to ±60°.

== Varieties ==
An RVDT can also be designed with two laminations, one containing the primary and the other, the secondaries. These types can operate on larger rotations.

A similar transformer is called the Rotary Variable Transformer and contains only one secondary winding giving only one voltage:

$$V = G \cdot\ \theta\$$

== See also ==
- LVDT, Linear-movement counterpart to the RVDT
- Rotary encoder
- Resolver, an angle sensor which operates over a full 360°
- Synchro, a three-phase variant of the resolver
- Rotary transformer
