= Signal conditioning =

Manipulation of an analog signal into a form suitable for further processing

In electronics and signal processing, signal conditioning is the manipulation of an analog signal in such a way that it meets the requirements of the next stage for further processing.

In an analog-to-digital converter (ADC) application, signal conditioning includes voltage or current limiting and anti-aliasing filtering.

In control engineering applications, it is common to have a sensing stage (which consists of a sensor), a signal conditioning stage (where usually amplification of the signal is done) and a processing stage (often carried out by an ADC and a micro-controller). Operational amplifiers (op-amps) are commonly employed to carry out the amplification of the signal in the signal conditioning stage. In some transducers, signal conditioning is integrated with the sensor, for example in Hall-effect sensors.

In power electronics, before processing the input sensed signals by sensors like voltage sensor and current sensor, signal conditioning scales signals to level acceptable to the microprocessor.

== Inputs ==
Signal inputs accepted by signal conditioners include DC voltage and current, AC voltage and current, frequency and electric charge. Sensor inputs can be accelerometer, thermocouple, thermistor, resistance thermometer, strain gauge or bridge, and LVDT or RVDT. Specialized inputs include encoder, counter or tachometer, timer or clock, relay or switch, and other specialized inputs. Outputs for signal conditioning equipment can be voltage, current, frequency, timer or counter, relay, resistance or potentiometer, and other specialized outputs.

== Processes ==
Signal conditioning can include amplification, filtering, converting, range matching, isolation and any other processes required to make sensor output suitable for processing after conditioning.

=== Input coupling ===
Use AC coupling when the signal contains a large DC component. If you enable AC coupling, you remove the large DC offset for the input amplifier and amplify only the AC component. This configuration makes effective use of the ADC dynamic range

=== Filtering ===
Filtering is the most common signal conditioning function, as usually not all the signal frequency spectrum contains valid data. For example, the 50 or 60 Hz AC power lines, present in most environments induce noise on signals that can cause interference if amplified.

=== Amplification ===
Signal amplification performs two important functions: increases the resolution of the input signal, and increases its signal-to-noise ratio. For example, the output of an electronic temperature sensor, which is probably in the millivolts range is probably too low for an analog-to-digital converter (ADC) to process directly. In this case it is necessary to bring the voltage level up to that required by the ADC.

Commonly used amplifiers used for signal conditioning include sample and hold amplifiers, peak detectors, log amplifiers, antilog amplifiers, instrumentation amplifiers and programmable gain amplifiers.

=== Attenuation ===
Attenuation, the opposite of amplification, is necessary when voltages to be digitized are beyond the ADC range. This form of signal conditioning decreases the input signal amplitude so that the conditioned signal is within ADC range. Attenuation is typically necessary when measuring voltages that are more than 10 V.

=== Excitation ===
Some sensors require external voltage or current source of excitation, These sensors are called active sensors. (E.g. a temperature sensor like a thermistor & RTD, a pressure sensor (piezo-resistive and capacitive), etc.). The stability and precision of the excitation signal directly relates to the sensor accuracy and stability.

=== Linearization ===
Linearization is necessary when sensors produce voltage signals that are not linearly related to the physical measurement. Linearization is the process of interpreting the signal from the sensor and can be done either with signal conditioning or through software.

=== Electrical isolation ===
Signal isolation may be used to pass the signal from the source to the measuring device without a physical connection. It is often used to isolate possible sources of signal perturbations that could otherwise follow the electrical path from the sensor to the processing circuitry. In some situations, it may be important to isolate the potentially expensive equipment used to process the signal after conditioning from the sensor.

Magnetic or optical isolation can be used. Magnetic isolation transforms the signal from a voltage to a magnetic field so the signal can be transmitted without physical connection (for example, using a transformer). Optical isolation works by using an electronic signal to modulate a signal encoded by light transmission (optical encoding). The decoded light transmission is then used for input for the next stage of processing.

=== Surge protection ===
A surge protector absorbs voltage spikes to protect the next stage from damage.
