= Eddy-current sensor =

Type of displacement sensor

Eddy current sensors are displacement sensors that use the principle of eddy current formation to sense displacement. These sensors measure shaft displacement in rotating machinery and have been around for many years as they offer manufacturers high-linearity, high-speed measurements, and high resolution. Eddy currents are formed when a moving or changing magnetic field intersects a conductor or vice versa.

Diagram of a coil inducing an eddy current in a conductive plate

The relative motion causes a circulating flow of electrons, or currents, within the conductor. These circulating eddies of current create electromagnets with magnet fields that oppose the effect of applied magnetic field. The stronger the applied magnetic field, or greater the electrical conductivity of the conductor, or greater the relative velocity of motion, the greater the currents developed and greater the opposing field. Eddy current probes senses this formation of secondary fields to find out the distance between the probe and target material.
