= Net radiometer =

Instrument for measuring the net radiation on Earth's surface

A net radiometer is a type of actinometer used to measure net radiation (NR) at the Earth's surface for meteorological applications. The name net radiometer reflects the fact that it measures the difference between downward/incoming and upward/outgoing radiation from Earth. It is most commonly used in the field of ecophysiology.

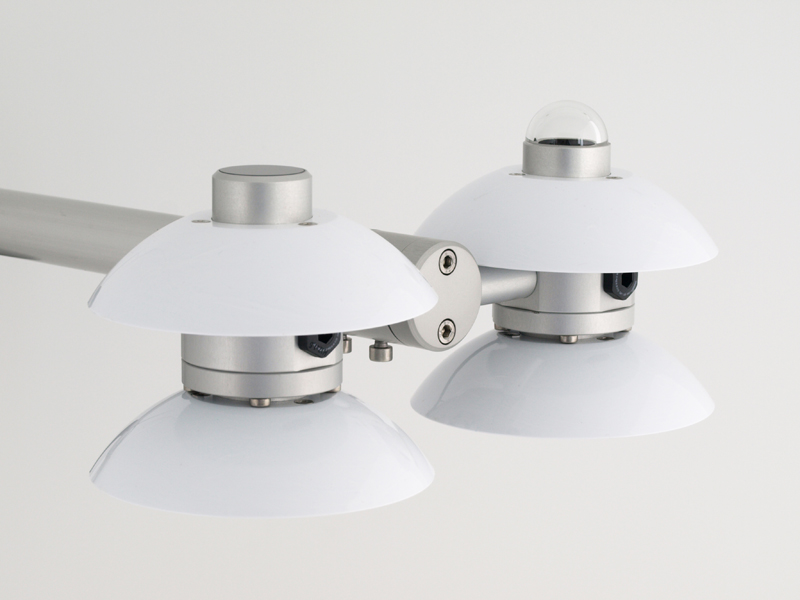
4-component net radiometer showing the instrument's main components: 2 pyranometers (with domes, one visible at right facing up and the second at right facing down obscured by the white radiation shield above it) and 2 pyrgeometers (flat windows, again one visible (facing up) and one obscured (facing down)). Dimensions: diameter of the pyranometer dome is 20 mm.

== See also ==
- radiometer
- pyranometer
- pyrgeometer
- irradiance
- Meteo-Technology instrumentation website
