= T-MOS thermal sensor =

Type of thermal sensor

TMOS is a type of thermal sensor consisting in a micromachined thermally isolated transistor fabricated using CMOS-SOI(Silicon on Insulator) MEMS(Micro electro-mechanical system) technology. It has been developed in the last decade by the Technion - Israel Institute of Technology. A thermal sensor is a device able to detect the thermal radiation emitted by an object located in the FOV(Field Of View) of the sensor. Infrared radiation ( IR ) striking the sensor produces a change in the temperature of the device that as a consequence generates an electric output signal proportional to the incident IR power. The sensor is able to approximate the temperature of the object radiating thanks to the information contained in the impinging radiation, assuming a black-body radiator based on the Stefan - Boltzmann law. TMOS detector has two important characteristics that make it different from others: it's an active and uncooled sensor.

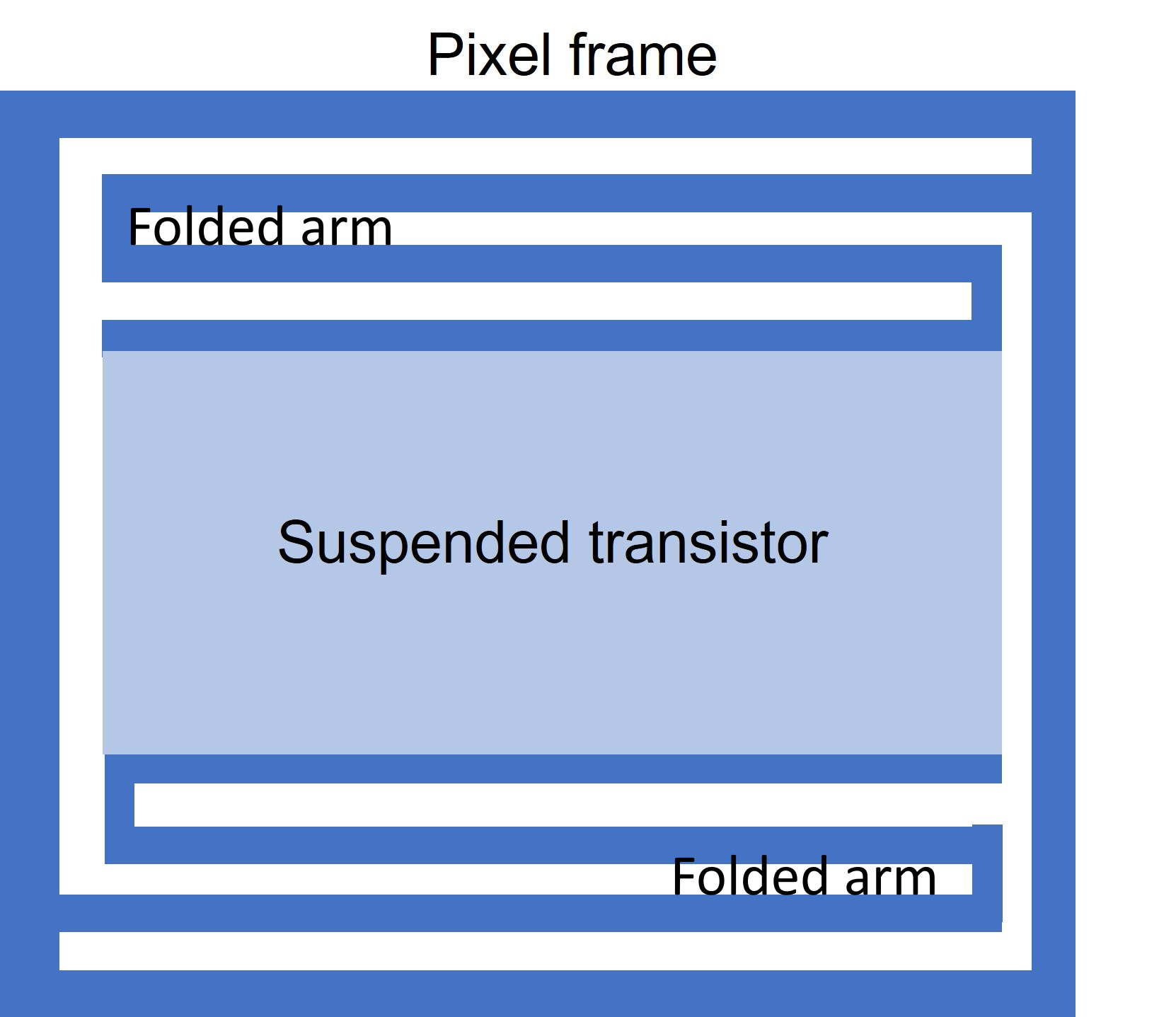
Schematic of the TMOS sub - pixel structure.

== Fabrication process ==
A TMOS detector consists in a mosaic structure composed of several sub-pixels, which are electrically connected in parallel or in series or in a mixed combination, and are thermally isolated. In each sub-pixels the sensitive element is the TMOS sensor, that is suspended in vacuum, fabricated in CMOS - SOI technology and dry released. The mosaic structure includes: the pixel frame, the suspended transistor, that absorbs IR radiation and that could also be embedded in an absorbing IR membrane which determine the thermal capacitance of the sensor, and two folding arms that determine the sensor thermal conductivity.

TMOS fabrication is based on built - in masks and dry bulk micromachining. In TMOS fabrication to the standard CMOS - SOI technology, used to produce MOS transistor, is added a MEMS post process necessary to realize the folded arms and the suspension of the transistor. In standard CMOS process there are several metallization layers. In TMOS production the upper ones, made in aluminum or copper, are used as built - in masks. Both metals are not affected by the fluorine plasma, used to dry etch silicon and interlevel dielectrics. The use of built- in mask grants high alignment accuracy and resolution while reducing fabrication costs. Final step of MEMS post process is the metal mask removal. This step is performed using standard wet etchant of aluminum or copper.

At present 130 nm CMOS - SOI technology implemented on 8 inch wafers is used to produce TMOS sensors, employing wafer level processing in standard CMOS facilities, allowing cost reduction and large production volumes.

=== Packaging ===
To improve sensor's performance and to protect it from the surrounding environment, especially from moisture, TMOS sensor are packaged under vacuum. The wafer-level production enables also wafer-level packaging, allowing the possibility to integrate optical windows and filters to improve their efficiency and widening their applicability.

TMOS package contains two devices: one "active", that sense and is exposed to external radiation, and another one "blind", that is shielded from the outside through an aluminum mirror deposited on the package.

== Operating principle ==
The working principle of TMOS sensor provides that when thermal IR radiation is absorbed in the sensitive area heats up the TMOS causing a variation in its temperature. The temperature change produces a current or a voltage output signal proportional to the absorbed radiation.

TMOS performance depends on the transistor operating region and configuration: two terminals component, diode-like configuration, or three terminals component. Two terminals configuration is characterized by a greater thermal isolation. On the other side the three-terminal configuration has a higher internal voltage gain, given by the higher output resistivity.

Subthreshold region is the preferred one because it avoids self heating effects and leads to higher sensitivity. Another reason to work in subthreshold region is that TMOS is an active device so requires a bias, however in this operating region the power consumption is lower than in other ones.

From a circuit point of view the produced TMOS signal can be modelled as a temperature dependent current source $i_{sig}$ in parallel with the $g_mV_{gs}$ generator for small signal equivalent circuit. The value of $i_{sig}$ is directly proportional to the drain source current variation with respect to TMOS operating temperature and to the temperature variation induced on the TMOS by the radiation absorbed from target object. This temperature has a direct dependence on the absorbing efficiency, the incident radiation power and on the thermal conductance of the sensor.

As mentioned in the previous section TMOS sensor package contains two devices, so the signal is read in a differential configuration. In this way the blind TMOS represents a reference relative to which the measure is done. This configuration is useful because allows to reject the common mode signal and reduce self heating effects.

=== Responsivity ===
The most important figure of merit of every kind of sensor is its responsivity. The responsivity is defined as the ratio between the output electrical parameters, both current or voltage, and the incident power on the detector. For TMOS sensor working in subthreshold region is 1,25 × 10^{7} V/W.

$R = {V_{out} \over P_{in}}$

=== TCC and TCV ===
TMOS sensitivity depends if the device is working in current or voltage mode. In current mode a bias voltage is applied, the current increases by an increment, which is the signal current. In the first case sensitivity corresponds to the temperature coefficient of current TCC, that is inversely proportional to drain source current and directly proportional to the derivative of drain source current respect to the operating temperature. In contrast, at voltage mode, where a bias current is applied, the voltage decreases by an increment, which is the voltage signal. In voltage mode the sensitivity is the temperature coefficient of voltage TCV and is inversely proportional to the voltage bias and directly proportional to the derivative of voltage respect to temperature for the considered operating temperature. TCC values above 4%/K are achieved working in the subthreshold region.

== Advantages ==
TMOS thermal sensor presents several advantages compared to other thermal sensors such as thermopiles, bolometers, and also microbolometers, which have a very similar structure. Both thermopile and bolometer are passive detectors while microbolometers can also have an active structure, but the transistor used is a TFT (thin-film transistor).

The main advantages of using TMOS sensor are:

- High sensitivity and responsivity due to the active working mode, and in particular biasing the transistor in subthreshold region.
- Low power consumption, that makes it suitable for IOT and wearable applications.
- High internal gain.
- High reproducible and reliable fabrication process.
- Low fabrication costs due to CMOS compatible fabrication process used.
- Large volumes production, makes it suitable for consumer electronics.

== Disadvantages ==
The main disadvantage is in the limited sensitivity compared with cooled IR detectors. Quantum photon detectors, for example, reach higher sensitivity but they need to work at cryogenic temperatures, so require a cooling system which consumes a lot of power.

== Applications ==
Thermal sensors may have a lot of different applications. They respond to thermal IR radiation so their main application is for the production of thermal IR cameras. The other possible applications regard different fields from gas analysis, human detection for autonomous driving, presence detection, people counting, security system, or thermal monitoring during the fabrication process.

Until now the main TMOS application has been as a high-sensitivity detector for motion and presence. When an object enters the FOV of the sensor there is a change in the radiation power that reaches the detector. This changing cause a temperature variation concerning the previous case and so coming from this difference the presence or motion is detected. This changing cause a temperature variation respect to previous case and so coming from this difference the presence or motion is detected. TMOS presence commercial products are available.

The low power consumption typical of the TMOS sensor means that it can also be powered by a common ion battery, making it suitable for IOT, wearable devices, mobile phone integration, and smart homes.

The human body emitted radiation falls in the mid-infrared range peaking around 12 μm, so one of the applications of thermal sensors is fever detection. TMOS high performance, in terms of high sensitivity and low power consumption, and low costs fabrication process make it a promising candidate to implement contactless thermometer.

== See also ==
- Bolometer
- CMOS
- Infrared radiation
- MOSFET
- Semiconductor fabrication process
- Thermal radiation
- Thermopile
