= Heat flux =

Vector representing the energy passing through a given area per unit time

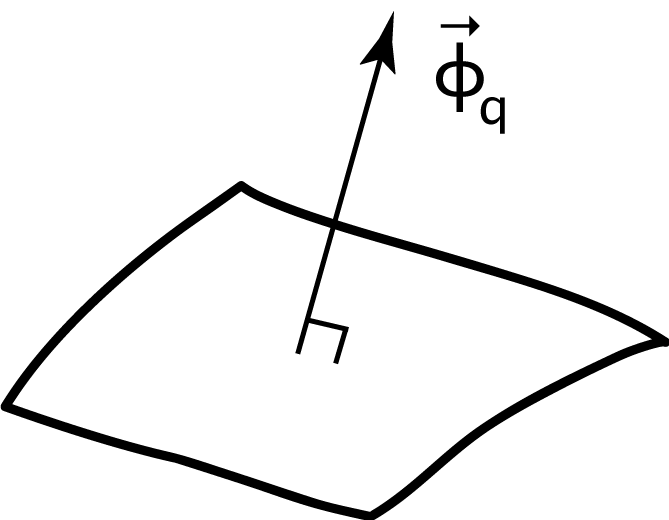
- Heat flux $\vec{\phi}_\mathrm{q}$ through a surface.
- Common symbols: $\vec{\phi}_\mathrm{q}$
- SI unit: W/m^{2}
- Other units: Btu/(h⋅ft^{2})
- In SI base units: kg⋅s^{−3}
- Dimension: $\mathsf{M} \mathsf{T}^{-3}$

In physics and engineering, heat flux or thermal flux, sometimes also referred to as heat flux density (Note: The word "flux" is used in most physical disciplines to refer to the flow of a quantity (mass, heat, momentum, etc.) across a surface per unit time per unit area, with the primary exception being in electromagnetism, where it refers to the integral of a vector quantity through a surface. Refer to the Flux article for more detail.), heat-flow density or heat-flow rate intensity, is a flow of energy per unit area per unit time. Its SI units are watts per square metre (W/m^{2}). It has both a direction and a magnitude, and so it is a vector quantity. To define the heat flux at a certain point in space, one takes the limiting case where the size of the surface becomes infinitesimally small.

Heat flux is often denoted $\vec{\phi}_\mathrm{q}$, the subscript q specifying heat flux, as opposed to mass or momentum flux. Fourier's law is an important application of these concepts.

== Fourier's law ==
For most solids in usual conditions, heat is transported mainly by conduction and the heat flux is adequately described by Fourier's law.

=== Fourier's law in one dimension ===
$$\phi_\text{q} = -k \frac{\mathrm{d}T(x)}{\mathrm{d}x}$$

where $k$ is the thermal conductivity. The negative sign shows that heat flux moves from higher temperature regions to lower temperature regions.

=== Multi-dimensional extension ===
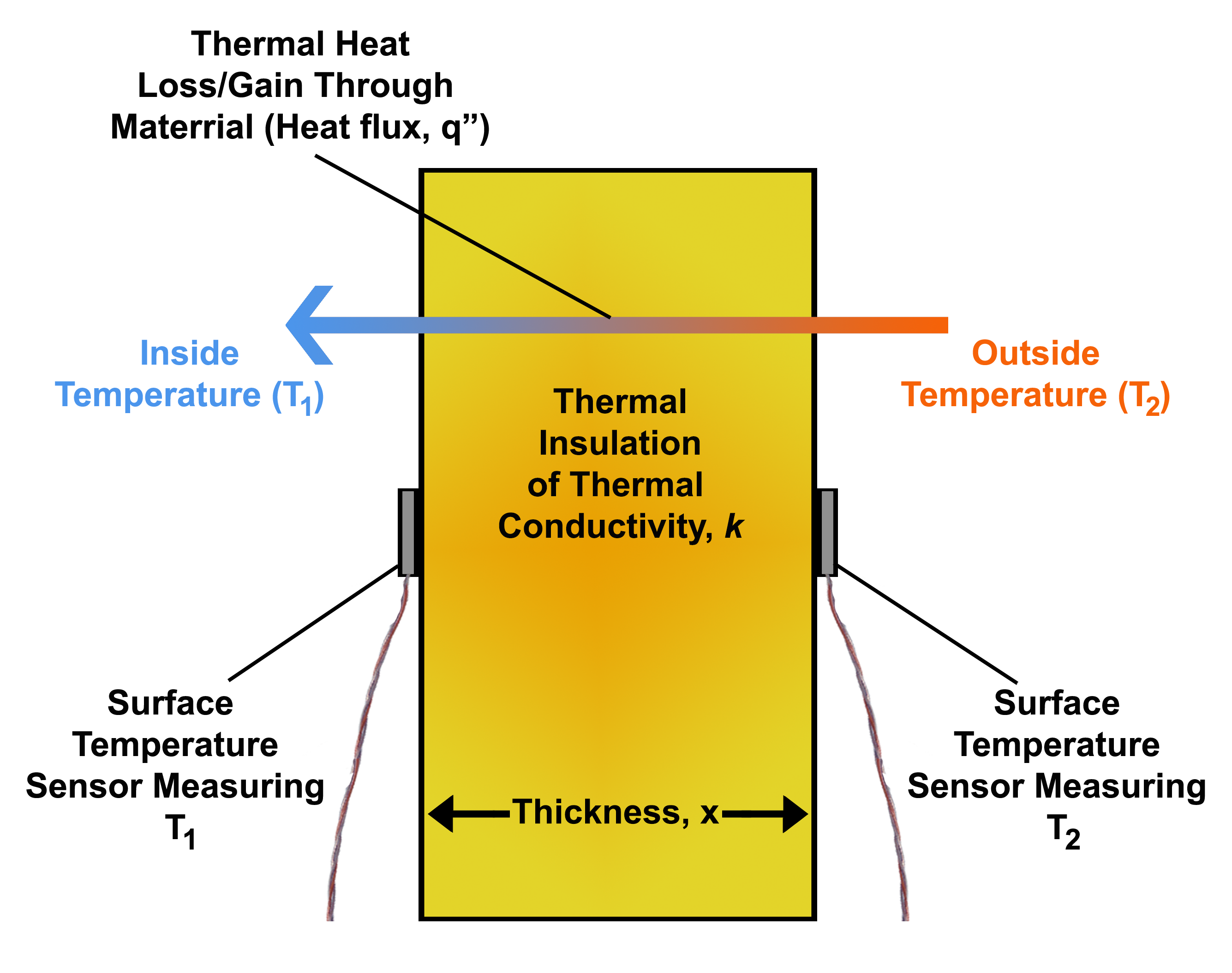
Diagram depicting heat flux through a thermal insulation material with thermal conductivity, k, and thickness, x. Heat flux can be determined using two surface temperature measurements on either side of the material using temperature sensors if k and x of the material are also known.

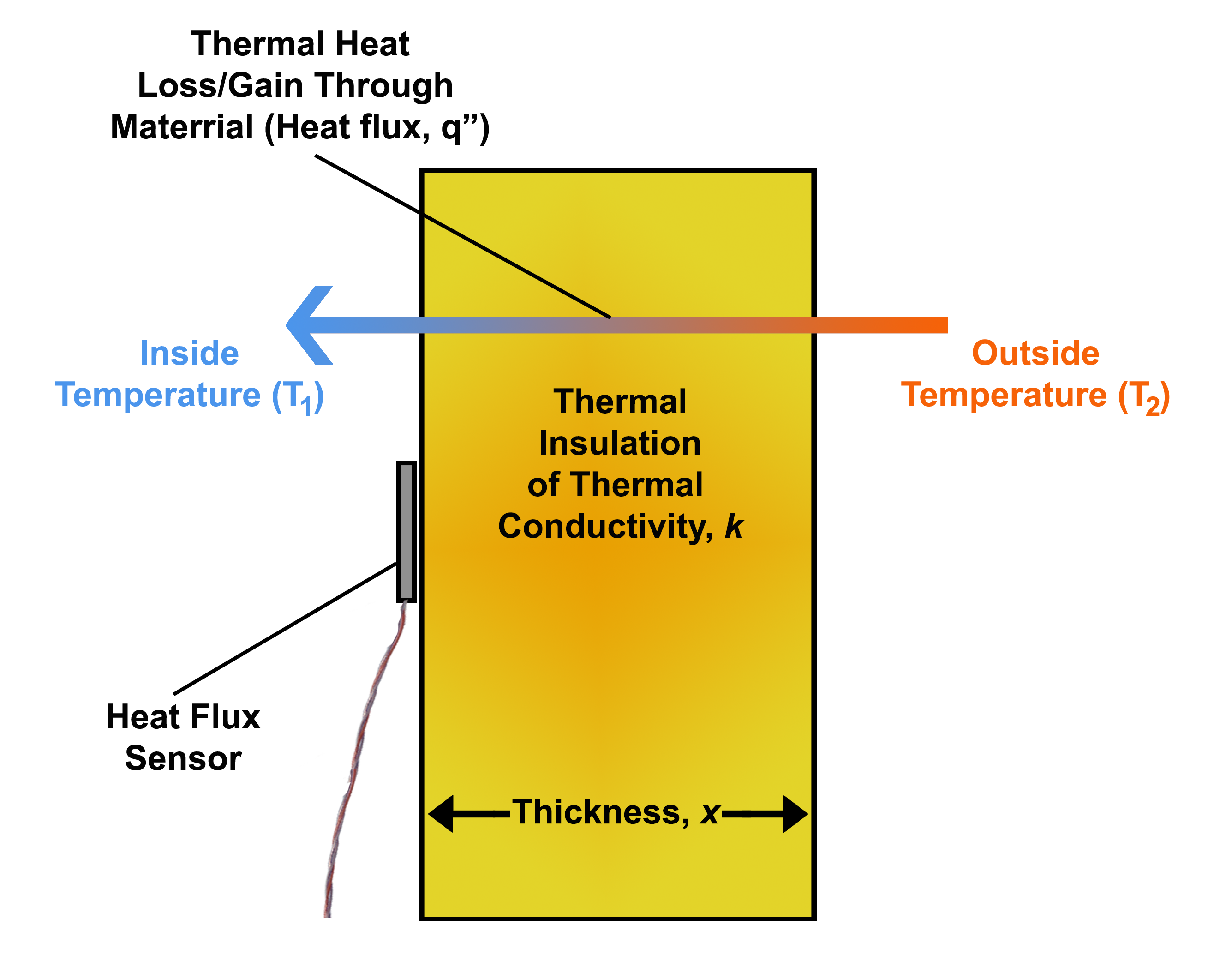
Diagram depicting heat flux through a thermal insulation material with thermal conductivity, k, and thickness, x. Heat flux can be directly measured using a single heat flux sensor located on either surface or embedded within the material. Using this method, knowing the values of k and x of the material are not required.

The multi-dimensional case is similar, the heat flux goes "down" and hence the temperature gradient has the negative sign:

$$\vec{\phi}_\mathrm{q} = - k \nabla T$$
where ${\nabla}$ is the gradient operator.

== Measurement ==
The measurement of heat flux can be performed in a few different manners.

=== With a given thermal conductivity ===
A commonly known, but often impractical, method is performed by measuring a temperature difference over a piece of material with a well-known thermal conductivity. This method is analogous to a standard way to measure an electric current, where one measures the voltage drop over a known resistor. Usually this method is difficult to perform since the thermal resistance of the material being tested is often not known. Accurate values for the material's thickness and thermal conductivity would be required in order to determine thermal resistance. Using the thermal resistance, along with temperature measurements on either side of the material, heat flux can then be indirectly calculated.

=== With unknown thermal conductivity ===
A second method of measuring heat flux is by using a heat flux sensor, or heat flux transducer, to directly measure the amount of heat being transferred to/from the surface that the heat flux sensor is mounted to. The most common type of heat flux sensor is a differential temperature thermopile which operates on essentially the same principle as the first measurement method that was mentioned except it has the advantage in that the thermal resistance/conductivity does not need to be a known parameter. These parameters do not have to be known since the heat flux sensor enables an in-situ measurement of the existing heat flux by using the Seebeck effect. However, differential thermopile heat flux sensors have to be calibrated in order to relate their output signals [μV] to heat flux values [W/(m^{2}⋅K)]. Once the heat flux sensor is calibrated it can then be used to directly measure heat flux without requiring the rarely known value of thermal resistance or thermal conductivity.

== Science and engineering ==
One of the tools in a scientist's or engineer's toolbox is the energy balance. Such a balance can be set up for any physical system, from chemical reactors to living organisms, and generally takes the following form

$$\big. \frac{\partial E_\mathrm{in}}{\partial t} - \frac{\partial E_\mathrm{out}}{\partial t} - \frac{\partial E_\mathrm{accumulated}}{\partial t} = 0$$

where the three $\big. \frac{\partial E}{\partial t}$ terms stand for the time rate of change of respectively the total amount of incoming energy, the total amount of outgoing energy and the total amount of accumulated energy.

Now, if the only way the system exchanges energy with its surroundings is through heat transfer, the heat rate can be used to calculate the energy balance, since

$$\frac{\partial E_\mathrm{in}}{\partial t} - \frac{\partial E_\mathrm{out}}{\partial t} = \oint_S \vec{\phi}_\mathrm{q} \cdot \, \mathrm{d} \vec{S}$$

where we have integrated the heat flux $\vec{\phi}_\mathrm{q}$ over the surface $S$ of the system.

In real-world applications one cannot know the exact heat flux at every point on the surface, but approximation schemes can be used to calculate the integral, for example Monte Carlo integration.

== See also ==
- Radiant flux
- Latent heat flux
- Rate of heat flow
- Insolation
- Heat flux sensor
- Relativistic heat conduction
