= Thermopile =

Device that converts thermal energy into electrical energy

A thermopile or a thermoelectric pile is a device that converts thermal energy into electrical energy. It is composed of several thermocouples connected usually in series or, less commonly, in parallel. Such a device works on the principle of the thermoelectric effect, i.e., generating a voltage when its dissimilar metals (thermocouples) are exposed to a temperature difference.

== Operation ==
Thermocouples operate by measuring the temperature differential from their junction point to the point in which the thermocouple output voltage is measured. Once a closed circuit is made up of more than one metal and there is a difference in temperature between junctions and points of transition from one metal to another, a current is produced as if generated by a difference of potential between the hot and cold junction.

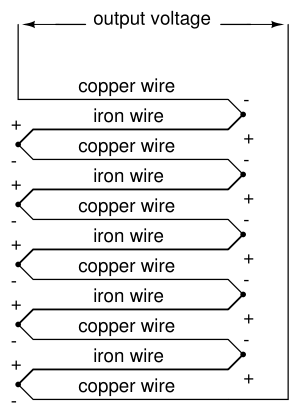
Thermopile, composed of multiple thermocouples in series. If both the right and left junctions are the same temperature, voltages cancel out to zero. However, if there is a temperature difference between junction sides the resulting output voltage is equal to the sum of junction voltage differentials.

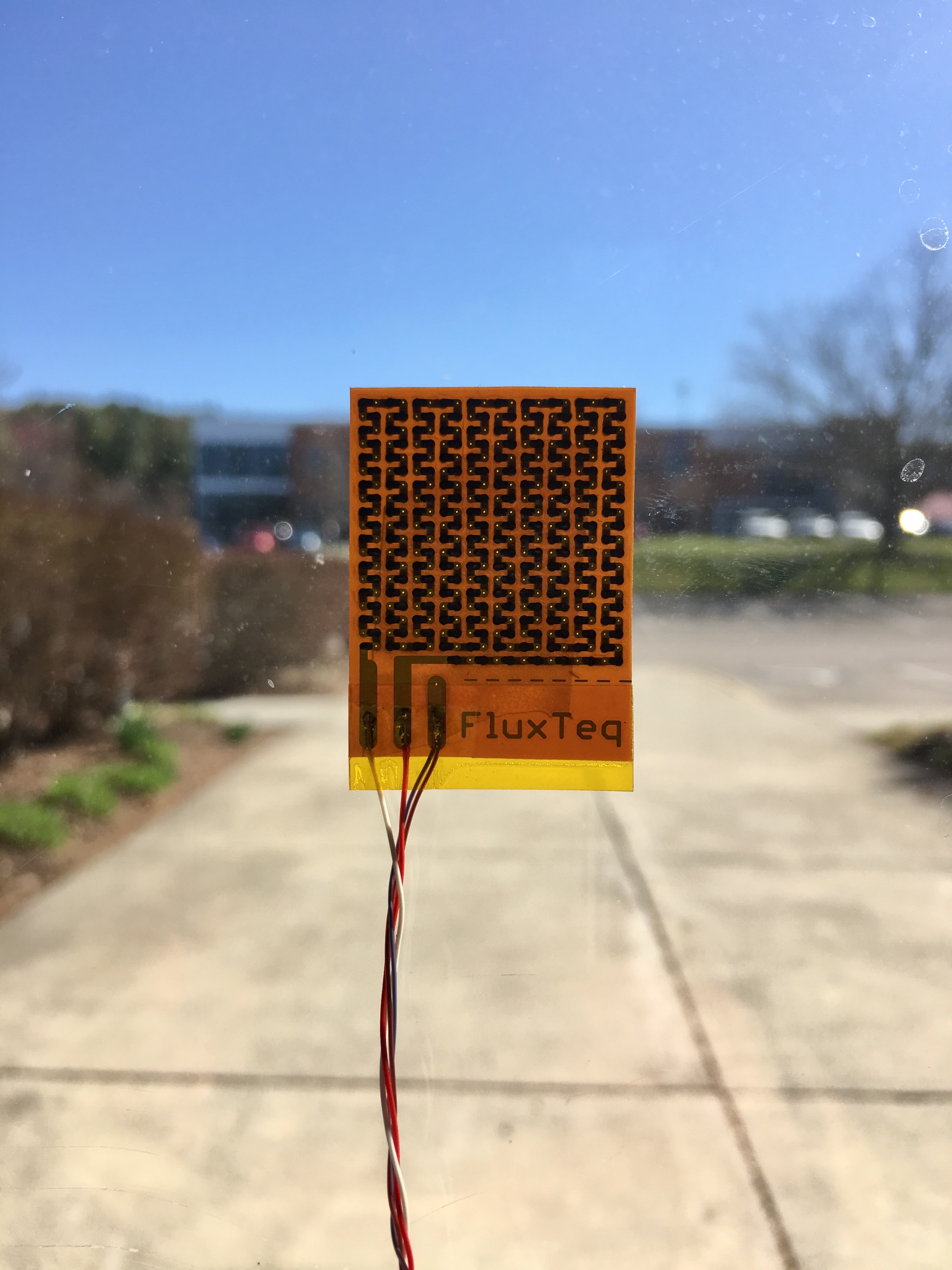
Picture of a heat flux sensor that utilizes a thermopile to measure heat flux. Model shown is the FluxTeq PHFS-01. The output is passively induced and proportional to the thermopile's temperature difference and number of thermocouples it consists of in series.

A thermopile usually consists of multiple thermocouples connected electrically in series and thermally in parallel, with junctions distributed between two isothermal regions. Each thermocouple produces a small voltage proportional to the temperature difference between its hot and cold junctions. By connecting many thermocouples, the voltages are summed, yielding an output that scales with both the temperature gradient and the number of junctions. Owing to their passive operation, thermopiles are widely used in non-contact infrared thermometry, energy harvesting, and process monitoring applications.

Thermopiles do not respond to absolute temperature, but generate an output voltage proportional to a local temperature difference or temperature gradient. The amount of voltage and power are very small and they are measured in millivolts and milliwatts using controlled devices that are specifically designed for such purpose.

== Applications ==
Thermopiles are used to provide an output in response to temperature as part of a temperature measuring device, such as the infrared thermometers widely used by medical professionals to measure body temperature, or in thermal accelerometers to measure the temperature profile inside the sealed cavity of the sensor. They are also used in heat flux sensors and pyrheliometers and gas burner safety controls. The output of a thermopile is usually in the range of tens or hundreds of millivolts. As well as increasing the signal level, the device may be used to provide spatial temperature averaging.

Thermopiles are also used to generate electrical energy from, for instance, heat from electrical components, solar wind, radioactive materials, laser radiation or combustion. The process is also an example of the Peltier effect (electric current transferring heat energy) as the process transfers heat from the hot to the cold junctions.

There are also the so-called thermopile sensors, which are power meters based on the principle that the optical or laser power is converted to heat and the resulting increase in temperature is measured by a thermopile.

== See also ==
- Seebeck effect, the physical effect responsible for the generation of voltage in a thermopile
- Thermoelectric materials, high-performance materials that can be used to construct a compact thermopile that delivers high power
