= Infrared open-path detector =

Infrared open-path gas detectors send out a beam of infrared light, detecting gas anywhere along the path of the beam. This linear 'sensor' is typically a few metres up to a few hundred metres in length. Open-path detectors can be contrasted with infrared point sensors.

They are widely used in the petroleum and petrochemical industries, mostly to achieve very rapid gas leak detection for flammable gases at concentrations comparable to the lower flammable limit (typically a few percent by volume). They are also used, but so far to a lesser extent, in other industries where flammable concentrations can occur, such as in coal mining and water treatment. In principle the technique can also be used to detect toxic gases, for instance hydrogen sulfide, at the necessary parts-per-million concentrations, but the technical difficulties involved have so far prevented widespread adoption for toxic gases.

Usually, there are separate transmitter and receiver units at either end of a straight beam path. Alternatively, the source and receiver are combined, and the beam bounced off a retroreflector at the far end of the measurement path. For portable use, detectors have also been made which use the natural albedo of surrounding objects in place of the retroreflector. The presence of a chosen gas (or class of gases) is detected from its absorption of a suitable infrared wavelength in the beam. Rain, fog etc. in the measurement path can also reduce the strength of the received signal, so it is usual to make a simultaneous measurement at one or more reference wavelengths. The quantity of gas intercepted by the beam is then inferred from the ratio of the signal losses at the measurement and reference wavelengths. The calculation is typically carried out by a microprocessor which also carries out various checks to validate the measurement and prevent false alarms.

The measured quantity is the sum of all the gas along the path of the beam, sometimes termed the path-integral concentration of the gas. Thus the measurement has a natural bias (desirable in many applications) towards the total size of an unintentional gas release, rather than the concentration of the gas that has reached any particular point. Whereas the natural units of measurement for an Infrared point sensor are parts-per-million (ppm) or the percentage of the lower flammable limit (%LFL), the natural units of measurement for an open path detector are ppm.metres (ppm.m) or LFL.metres (LFL.m). For instance, the fire and gas safety system on an offshore platform in the North Sea typically has detectors set to a full-scale reading of 5LFL.m, with low and high alarms triggered at 1LFL.m and 3LFL.m respectively.

== Advantages and disadvantages versus fixed-point detectors ==
An open path detector usually costs more than a single point detector, so there is little incentive for applications that play to a point detector's strengths: where the point detector can be placed at the known location of the highest gas concentration, and a relatively slow response is acceptable. The open path detector excels in outdoor situations where, even if the likely source of the gas release is known, the evolution of the developing cloud or plume is unpredictable. Gas will almost certainly enter an extended linear beam before finding its way to any single chosen point. Also, point detectors in exposed outdoor locations require weather shields to be fitted, increasing the response time significantly. Open path detectors can also show a cost advantage in any application where a row of point detectors would be required to achieve the same coverage, for instance monitoring along a pipeline, or around the perimeter of a plant. Not only will one detector replace several, but the costs of installation, maintenance, cabling etc. are likely to be lower.

== Component parts ==
In principle any source of infrared radiation could be used, together with an optical system of lenses or mirrors to form the transmitted beam. In practice the following sources have been used, always with some form of modulation to aid the signal processing at the receiver:

An incandescent light bulb, modulated by pulsing the current powering the filament or by a mechanical chopper. For systems used outdoors, it is difficult for an incandescent source to compete with the intensity of sunlight when the sun shines directly into the receiver. Also, it is difficult to achieve modulation frequencies distinguishable from those that can be produced naturally, for instance by heat shimmer or by sunlight reflecting off waves at sea.

A gas-discharge lamp is capable of exceeding the spectral power of direct sunlight in the infrared, especially when pulsed. Modern open path systems typically use a xenon flashtube powered by a capacitor discharge. Such pulsed sources are inherently modulated.

A semiconductor laser provides a relatively weak source, but one that can be modulated at high frequency in wavelength as well as amplitude. This property permits various signal processing schemes based on Fourier analysis, of use when the absorption of the gas is weak but narrow in spectral linewidth.

The precise wavelength passbands used must be isolated from the broad infrared spectrum. In principle any conventional spectrometer technique is possible, but the NDIR technique with multilayer dielectric filters and beamsplitters is most often used. These wavelength-defining components are usually located in the receiver, although one design has shared the task with the transmitter.

At the receiver, the infrared signal strengths are measured by some form of infrared detector. Generally photodiode detectors are preferred, and are essential for the higher modulation frequencies, whereas slower photoconductive detectors may be required for longer wavelength regions. The signals are fed to low-noise amplifiers, then invariably subject to some form of digital signal processing. The absorption coefficient of the gas will vary across the passband, so the simple Beer–Lambert law cannot be applied directly. For this reason the processing usually employs a calibration table, applicable for a particular gas, type of gas, or gas mixture, and sometimes configurable by the user.

== Operating wavelengths ==
The choice of infrared wavelengths used for the measurement largely defines the detector's suitability for a particular applications. Not only must the target gas (or gases) have a suitable absorption spectrum, the wavelengths must lie within a spectral window so the air in the beam path is itself transparent. These wavelength regions have been used:

- 3.4 μm region. All hydrocarbons and their derivatives absorb strongly, due to the C-H stretch mode of molecular vibration. It is commonly used in infrared point detectors where path lengths are necessarily short, and for open-path detectors requiring parts-per-million sensitivity. A disadvantage for many applications is that methane absorbs relatively weakly compared to heavier hydrocarbons, leading to large inconsistencies of calibration. For open-path detection of flammable concentrations the absorption for non-methane hydrocarbons is so strong that the measurement saturates, a significant gas cloud appearing 'black'. This wavelength region is beyond the transmission range of borosilicate glass, so windows and lenses must be made of more expensive materials and tend to be small in aperture.
- 2.3 μm region. All hydrocarbons and their derivatives have absorption coefficients appropriate for open path detection at flammable concentrations. A useful advantage in practical applications is that the detector's response to many different gases and vapours is relatively uniform when expressed in terms of the lower flammable limit. Borosilicate glass retains useful transmission in this wavelength region, allowing large aperture optics to be produced at moderate cost.
- 1.6 μm region. A wide range of gases absorb in the near-infrared. Typically the absorption coefficients are relatively weak, but light molecules show narrow, individually resolved spectral lines rather than broad bands. This results in relatively large values of the gradient and curvature of the absorption with respect to wavelength, enabling semiconductor laser-based systems to distinguish gas molecules very specifically; for instance hydrogen sulfide, or methane to the exclusion of heavier hydrocarbons.

== History ==
The first open-path detector offered for routine industrial use, as distinct from research instruments built in small numbers, was the Wright and Wright 'Pathwatch' in the US, 1983. Acquired by Det-Tronics (Detector Electronics Corporation) in 1992, the detector operated in the 3.4 μm region with a powerful incandescent source and a mechanical chopper. It did not achieve large volume sales, mainly because of cost and doubts about long-term reliability with moving parts. Beginning in 1985, Shell Research in UK was funded by Shell Natural Gas to develop an open-path detector with no moving parts. The advantages of the 2.3 μm wavelength were identified, and a research prototype was demonstrated. This design had a combined transmitter-receiver with a corner-cube retroreflector at 50 m. It used a pulsed incandescent lamp, PbS photoconductive detectors in the gas and reference channels, and an Intel 8031 microprocessor for signal processing. In 1987 Shell licensed this technology to Sieger-Zellweger (later Honeywell) who designed and marketed their industrial version as the 'Searchline', using a retro-reflective panel made up of multiple corner-cubes. This was the first open-path detector to be certified for use in hazardous areas and to have no moving parts. Later work by Shell Research used two alternately pulsed incandescent sources in the transmitter and a single PbS detectors in the receiver, avoiding zero drifts caused by the variable responsivity of PbS detectors. This technology was offered to Sieger-Zellweger, and later licensed to PLMS. a company part-owned by Shell Ventures UK. The PLMS GD4001/2 in 1991 were the first detectors to achieve a truly stable zero without moving parts or software compensation of slow drifts. They were also the first infrared gas detectors of any kind to be certified intrinsically safe. The Israeli company Spectronix (also Spectrex) made an important advance in 1996 with their SafEye, the first to use a flash tube source, followed by Sieger-Zellweger with their Searchline Excel in 1998. In 2001 the PLMS Pulsar, soon afterwards acquired by Dräger as their Polytron Pulsar, was the first detector to incorporate sensing to monitor the mutual alignment of the transmitter and receiver during both installation and routine operation.
