= SGX Sensortech =

SGX Sensortech Limited
- Trade name: SGX Sensortech
- Formerly: e2v industrial gas sensors; e2v microsensors; MiCS Microsensors
- Type: Subsidiary
- Industry: Electronics (sensors and detectors)
- Predecessor: e2v technologies plc (instrumentation business)
- Founded: May 2012
- Founder: Baird Capital Partners Europe
- Headquarters: Neuchâtel, Switzerland
- Area served: Worldwide
- Parent: Amphenol (Advanced Technology Sensors Group)

SGX Sensortech Limited is a manufacturer and research company of sensors and detectors for Industrial Safety, and Environmental Monitoring. It is headquartered in Neuchatel, Switzerland with research and manufacturing sites in Katowice, Poland and Shanghai, China. SGX Sensortech since October 2016 is now part of the Advanced Technology Sensors group(ASTG)belonging to Amphenol

== History ==
SGX Sensortech Limited was formed in May 2012 when Baird Capital Partners Europe acquired the instrumentation business from e2v technologies plc, a provider of systems and equipment. The business that SGX Sensortech has acquired comprises what was formerly known as e2v industrial gas sensors, previously based in Chelmsford, UK; and e2v microsensors and MiCS Microsensors, based in Neuchatel, Switzerland.

== Products and Services ==
=== Industrial Safety ===
Gas Sensor technologies, design and manufacture of Infrared Sensors, Pellistor Sensors, Metal Oxide Sensors, Thermal Conductivity Sensors, Electrochemical Sensors and Evaluation Kits, with applications in Mining, Oil and gas, Confined space entry, Indoor air quality, Industrial area protection and Leak detection.

=== Environmental Monitoring ===
Metal-oxide sensors are produced for environmental gas detection, including, Automotive Air Quality Sensors (AQS), Interior Air Quality (IAQ), Outdoor Air Quality (OAQ), MeMs Pellistor sensors (mPell), IR Source and Module (MIMS) and MeMS Thermal Conductivity sensors for high volume markets such as the automotive industry.
