= Pensky–Martens closed-cup test =

Test for the flash point of flammable liquids

The Pensky–Martens closed-cup flash-point test is a test for the determination of the flash point of flammable liquids. It is standardized as ASTM D93, EN ISO 2719 and IP 34 The United States Environmental Protection Agency (EPA) has also published Method 1010A: Test Methods for Flash Point by Pensky-Martens Closed Cup Tester, part of Test Methods for Evaluating Solid Waste, Physical/Chemical Methods, which references the ASTM standard series D93. The Pensky-Martens test is a closed-cup method as opposed to the Cleveland open-cup method.

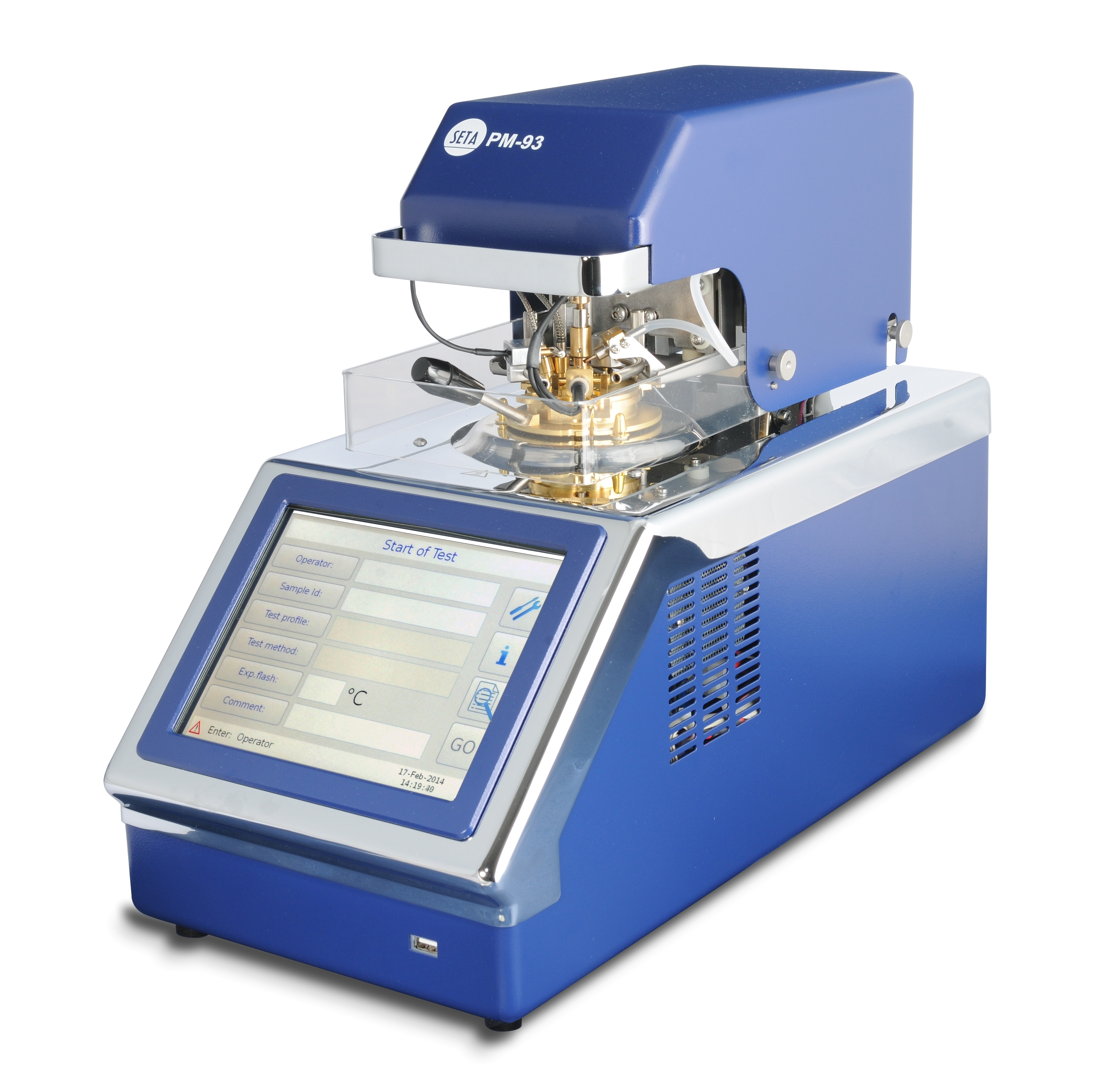
Automatic Pensky-Martens closed cup tester with integrated fire extinguisher

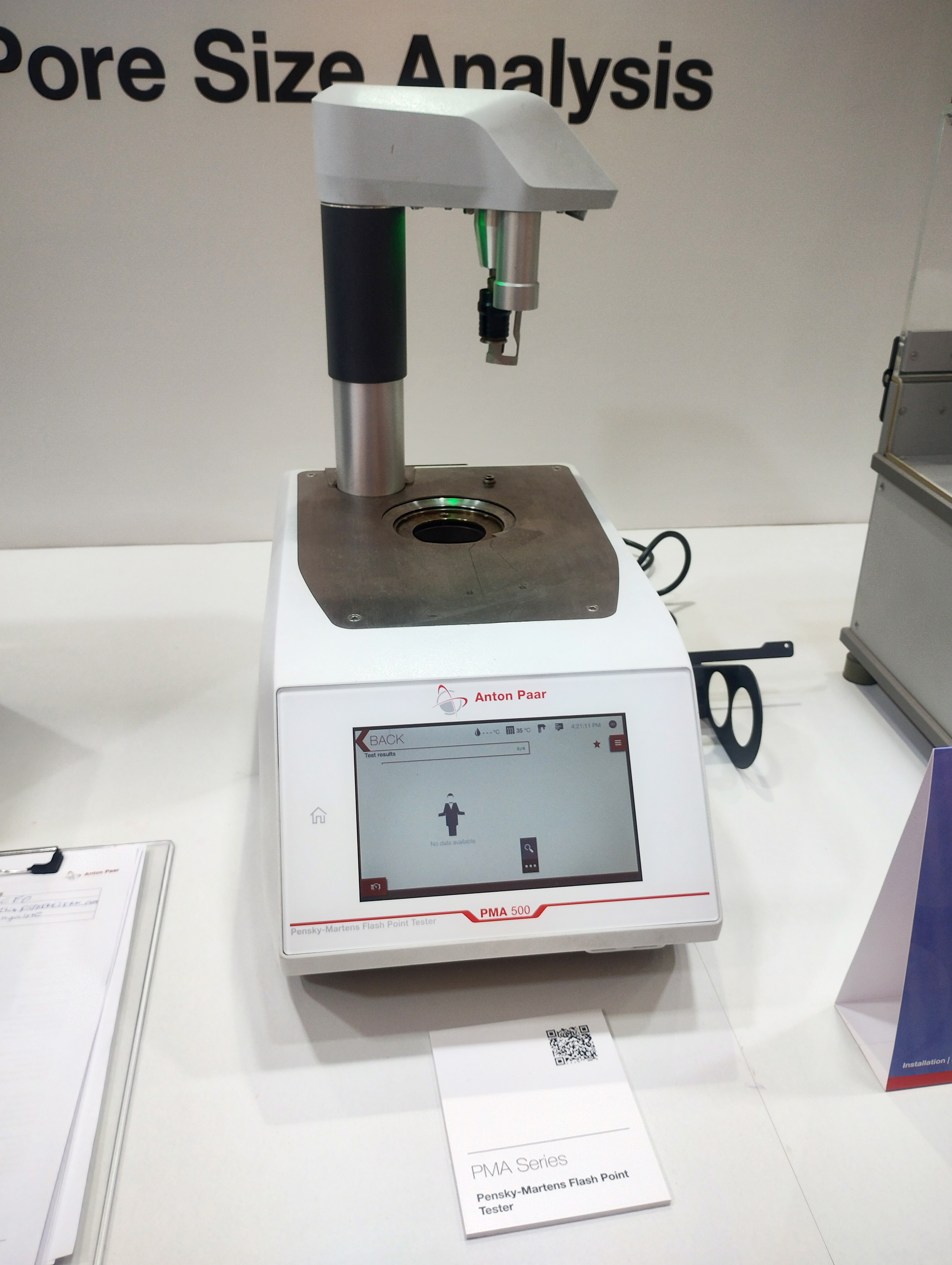
Anton Paar Pensky-Martens Flash Point Tester at DEF-TECH Bharat 2026, KTPO, Bengaluru

== Test procedure ==
A brass test cup is filled with a test specimen and closed with a lid, through which an ignition source can be introduced periodically. The sample is heated and stirred at specified rates depending on the material that is being tested. This allows the development of an equilibrium between the liquid and the air volume. The ignition source is directed into the cup at regular intervals with simultaneous interruption of stirring. The test concludes upon observation of a flash that spreads throughout the inside of the cup. The corresponding temperature is the liquid's flash point.

== Critique of test method ==
The different flash point methods depend on the controlled conditions in the laboratory and do not determine an intrinsic property of the material tested. They are however useful to compare different substances and is therefore widely used in road transportation and environmental safety regulations.

Closed cup testers give lower values for the flashpoint than open-cup testers (typically 5–10 K) and are a better approximation to the temperature at which the vapour pressure reaches the "Lower flammable limit" (LFL).
