= Explosimeter =

Gas detector

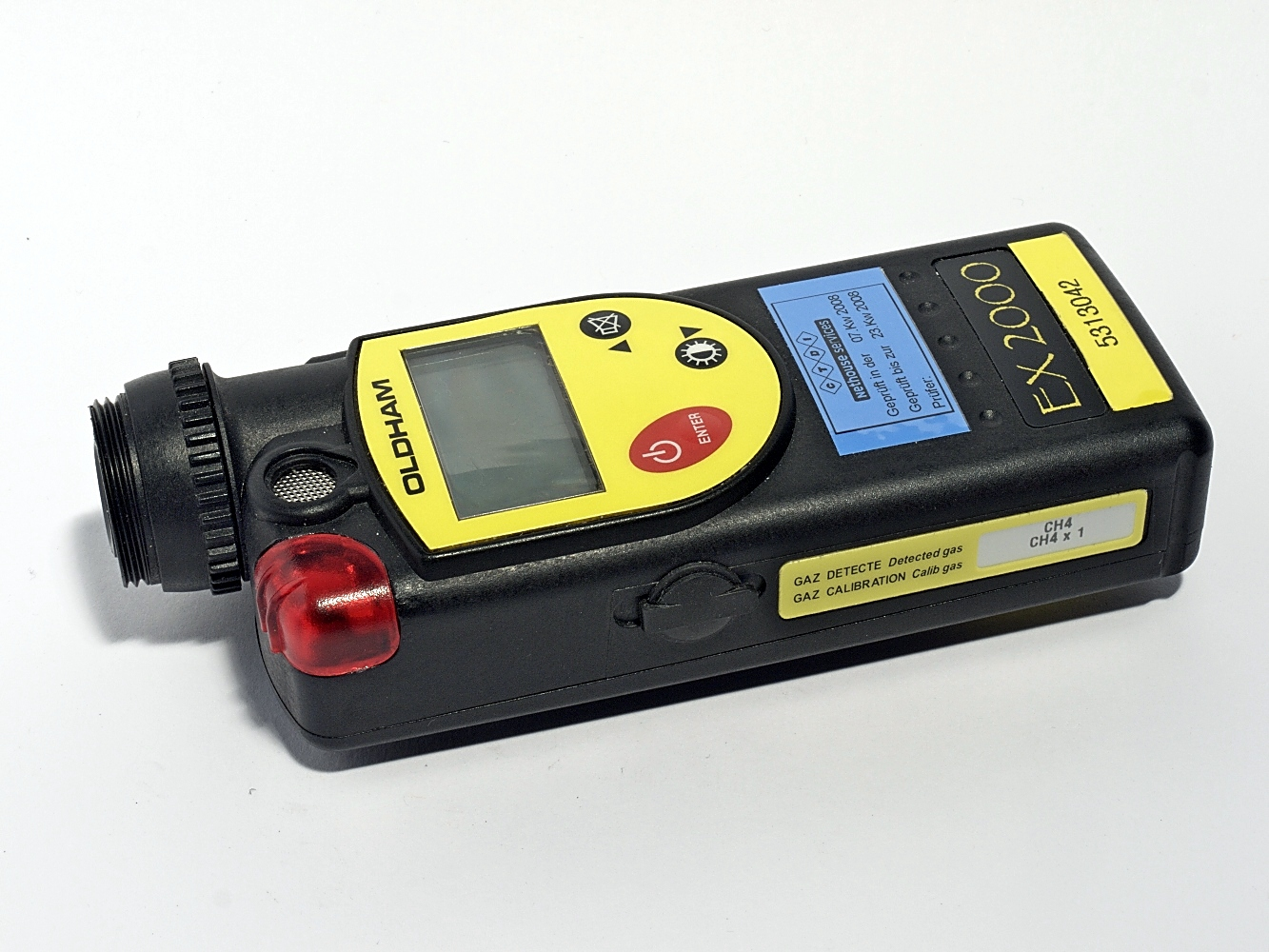
Oldham EX2000 portable explosimeter

An explosimeter is a gas detector which is used to measure the amount of combustible gases present in a sample. When a percentage of the lower explosive limit (LEL) of an atmosphere is exceeded, an alarm signal on the instrument is activated.

The device, also called a combustible gas detector, operates on the principle of resistance proportional to heat—a wire is heated, and a sample of the gas is introduced to the hot wire. Combustible gases burn in the presence of the hot wire, thus increasing the resistance and disturbing a Wheatstone bridge, which gives the reading. A flashback arrestor is installed in the device to avoid the explosimeter igniting the sample external to the device.

Note, that the detection readings of an explosimeter are only accurate if the gas being sampled has the same characteristics and response as the calibration gas. Most explosimeters are calibrated to methane, hydrogen, and carbon monoxide.

Explosimeters are important because workspaces may contain a flammable or explosive atmosphere due to the accumulation of flammable gases or vapors. Sparks from ordinary battery-powered portable equipment, including cameras, cell phones, laptop computers, or anything else located on the job site may serve as an ignition source. The explosimeter warns the user of dangerous atmospheric conditions before a possible explosion can occur.

== Explosimetry ==
Explosimetry simply means the measurement of flammable or explosive conditions, normally in the atmosphere around us. In modern times, jobsites both above ground and below ground can have a wide range of dangerous flammable materials present. The danger of these flammable materials are mitigated by detection systems. Explosimetry sensors are integrated into stationary and portable devices to detect the concentration of the calibrated gas in air. The explosimeter is an example of a detection system with an explosimetry sensor in it.

For explosimeters to work properly they must be calibrated for a particular type of gas. Explosimeters do not know what kind of gas it is detecting, it only recognizes that one or more combustible gases are present in the atmosphere. Once calibrated with a particular gas the instrument displays the LEL values assuming all the gases it is detecting are that one specific gas it was calibrated for.

In order to get a reading of an additional gas you will have to use a correlation factor. Correlation factors are used to translate instrument readings from the units of the calibrated gas to the units of a second desired gas.

== Lower explosive limit ==
LEL or "Lower explosive limit" is the minimum concentration of a particular combustible gas or vapor necessary to support its combustion in air. If the concentration of the substance is below the LEL then it is "too lean" to burn in air. Most explosimeters will have an audible signal at 25% or 50% LEL to provide early warning to the operator.

== Limitations ==
Although explosimeters are good at detecting a variety of gases and vapors, they do not detect them all. An inaccurate response is notable from vapors such as esters or higher molecular weight alcohols. When attempting to detect one of these vapors, it is recommended to get assurance from the manufacturer that the instrument is suitable for the job. A variety of flammable vapors are also toxic. Usually, the dangerous toxicity level is at lower concentrations and is reached before that of the flammability limit. Under these conditions, an instrument with greater sensitivity may be required to determine the levels in the toxicity range. Lastly, portable instruments are not suitable for monitoring long operations, so explosimeters specific for that purpose may be needed.
