= Gas detector =

Device to detect the presence or absence of gases

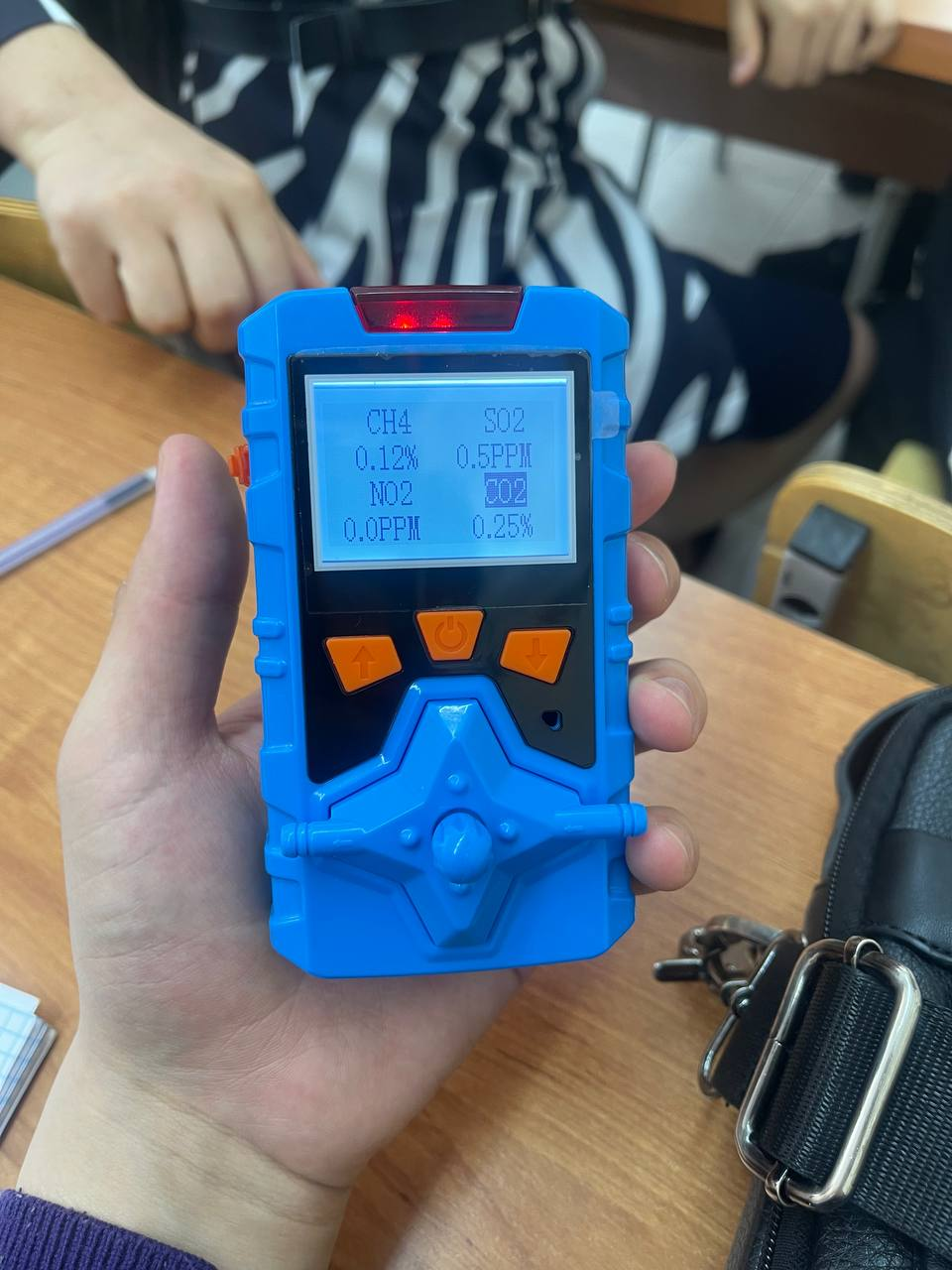
Portable multi-gas detector for detecting methane (CH_{4}), sulfur dioxide (SO_{2}), nitrogen dioxide (NO_{2}), and carbon dioxide (CO_{2})

A gas detector is a device that detects the presence of gases in a volume of space, often as part of a safety system. A gas detector can sound an alarm to operators in the area where the leak is occurring, giving them the opportunity to leave. This type of device is important because there are many gases that can be harmful to organic life, such as humans or animals.

Gas detectors can be used to detect combustible, flammable and toxic gases, and oxygen depletion. This type of device is used widely in industry and can be found in locations, such as on oil rigs, to monitor manufacturing processes and emerging technologies such as photovoltaic. They may be used in firefighting.

Gas leak detection is the process of identifying potentially hazardous gas leaks by sensors. Additionally a visual identification can be done using a thermal camera These sensors usually employ an audible alarm to alert people when a dangerous gas has been detected. Exposure to toxic gases can also occur in operations such as painting, fumigation, fuel filling, construction, excavation of contaminated soils, landfill operations, entering confined spaces, etc. Common sensors include combustible gas sensors, photoionization detectors, infrared point sensors, ultrasonic sensors, electrochemical gas sensors, and metal–oxide–semiconductor (MOS) sensors. More recently, infrared imaging sensors have come into use. All of these sensors are used for a wide range of applications and can be found in industrial plants, refineries, pharmaceutical manufacturing, fumigation facilities, paper pulp mills, aircraft and shipbuilding facilities, hazmat operations, waste-water treatment facilities, vehicles, indoor air quality testing and homes.

== History ==
Gas leak detection methods became a concern after the effects of harmful gases on human health were discovered. Before modern electronic sensors, early detection methods relied on less precise detectors. Through the 19th and early 20th centuries, coal miners would bring canaries down to the tunnels with them as an early detection system against life-threatening gases such as carbon dioxide, carbon monoxide and methane. The canary, normally a very songful bird, would stop singing and eventually die if not removed from these gases, signaling the miners to exit the mine quickly.

The first gas detector in the industrial age was the flame safety lamp (or Davy lamp) was invented by Sir Humphry Davy (of England) in 1815 to detect the presence of methane (firedamp) in underground coal mines. The flame safety lamp consisted of an oil flame adjusted to specific height in fresh air. To prevent ignition with these lamps the flame was contained within a glass sleeve with a mesh flame arrestor. The flames height varied depending on the presence of methane (higher) or the lack of oxygen (lower). To this day, in certain parts of the world flame safety lamps are still in service.

The modern era of gas detection started in 1926–1927 with the development of the catalytic combustion (LEL) sensor by Dr.Oliver Johnson. Dr Johnson was an employee of Standard Oil Company in California (now Chevron), he began research and development on a method to detect combustible mixtures in air to help prevent explosions in fuel storage tanks. A demonstration model was developed in 1926 and denoted as the Model A. The first practical "electric vapor indicator" meter begun production in 1927 with the release of the Model B.

The world's first gas detection company, Johnson-Williams Instruments (or J-W Instruments) was formed in 1928 in Palo Alto, CA by Dr Oliver Johnson and Phil Williams. J-W Instruments is recognized as the first electronics company in Silicon Valley. Over the next 40 years J-W Instruments pioneered many "firsts" in the modern age of gas detection, including making instruments smaller and more portable, development of a portable oxygen detector as well as the first combination instrument that could detect both combustible gases/vapors as well as oxygen.

Before the development of electronic household carbon monoxide detectors in the 1980s and 1990s, carbon monoxide presence was detected with a chemically infused paper that turned brown when exposed to the gas. Since then, many electronic technologies and devices have been developed to detect, monitor, and alert the leak of a wide array of gases.

As the cost and performance of electronic gas sensors improved, they have been incorporated into a wider range of systems. Their use in automobiles was initially for engine emissions control, but now gas sensors may also be used to ensure passenger comfort and safety. Carbon dioxide sensors are being installed into buildings as part of demand-controlled ventilation systems. Sophisticated gas sensor systems are being researched for use in medical diagnostic, monitoring, and treatment systems, well beyond their initial use in operating rooms. Gas monitors and alarms for carbon monoxide and other harmful gases are increasingly available for office and domestic use, and are becoming legally required in some jurisdictions.

Originally, detectors were produced to detect a single gas. Modern units may detect several toxic or combustible gases, or even a combination. Newer gas analyzers can break up the component signals from a complex aroma to identify several gases simultaneously.

Metal–oxide–semiconductor (MOS) sensors were introduced in the 1990s. The earliest known MOS gas sensor was demonstrated by G. Sberveglieri, G. Faglia, S. Groppelli, P. Nelli and A. Camanzi in 1990. MOS sensors have since become important environmental gas detectors.

== Types ==
Gas detectors can be classified according to the operation mechanism (semiconductor, oxidation, catalytic, photoionization, infrared, etc.). Gas detectors come packaged into two main form factors: portable devices and fixed gas detectors.

Portable detectors are used to monitor the atmosphere around personnel and are either hand-held or worn on clothing or on a belt/harness. These gas detectors are usually battery operated. They transmit warnings via audible and visible signals, such as alarms and flashing lights, when dangerous levels of gas vapors are detected.

Fixed type gas detectors may be used for detection of one or more gas types. Fixed type detectors are generally mounted near the process area of a plant or control room, or an area to be protected, such as a residential bedroom. Generally, industrial sensors are installed on fixed type mild steel structures and a cable connects the detectors to a supervisory control and data acquisition (SCADA) system for continuous monitoring. A tripping interlock can be activated for an emergency situation.

=== Electrochemical ===
Electrochemical gas detectors work by allowing gases to diffuse through a porous membrane to an electrode where it is either chemically oxidized or reduced. The amount of current produced is determined by how much of the gas is oxidized at the electrode, indicating the concentration of the gas. Manufactures can customize electrochemical gas detectors by changing the porous barrier to allow for the detection of a certain gas concentration range. Also, since the diffusion barrier is a physical/mechanical barrier, the detectors tend to be more stable and reliable over the sensor's duration and thus required less maintenance than other early detector technologies.

However, the sensors are subject to corrosive elements or chemical contamination and may last only 1–2 years before a replacement is required. Electrochemical gas detectors are used in a wide variety of environments such as refineries, gas turbines, chemical plants, underground gas storage facilities, and more.

=== Catalytic bead ===
Catalytic bead (pellistor) sensors are commonly used to measure combustible gases that present an explosion hazard when concentrations are between the lower explosion limit (LEL) and upper explosion limit (UEL). Active and reference beads containing platinum wire coils are situated on opposite arms of a Wheatstone bridge circuit and electrically heated, up to a few hundred degrees C. The active bead contains a catalyst that allows combustible compounds to oxidize, thereby heating the bead even further and changing its electrical resistance. The resulting voltage difference between the active and passive beads is proportional to the concentration of all combustible gases and vapors present. The sampled gas enters the sensor through a sintered metal frit, which provides a barrier to prevent an explosion when the instrument is carried into an atmosphere containing combustible gases. Pellistors measure essentially all combustible gases, but they are more sensitive to smaller molecules that diffuse through the sinter more quickly. The measurable concentration ranges are typically from a few hundred ppm to a few volume percent. Such sensors are inexpensive and robust, but require a minimum of a few percent oxygen in the atmosphere to be tested and they can be poisoned or inhibited by compounds such as silicones, mineral acids, chlorinated organic compounds, and sulfur compounds.

=== Photoionization ===
Photoionization detectors (PIDs) use a high-photon-energy UV lamp to ionize chemicals in the sampled gas. If the compound has an ionization energy below that of the lamp photons, an electron will be ejected, and the resulting current is proportional to the concentration of the compound. Common lamp photon energies include 10.0 eV, 10.6 eV and 11.7 eV; the standard 10.6 eV lamp lasts for years, while the 11.7 eV lamp typically last only a few months and is used only when no other option is available. A broad range of compounds can be detected at levels ranging from a few parts per billion (ppb) to several thousand parts per million (ppm). Detectable compound classes in order of decreasing sensitivity include: aromatics and alkyl iodides; olefins, sulfur compounds, amines, ketones, ethers, alkyl bromides and silicate esters; organic esters, alcohols, aldehydes and alkanes; hydrogen sulfide, ammonia, phosphine and organic acids. There is no response to standard components of air or to mineral acids. Major advantages of PIDs are their excellent sensitivity and simplicity of use; the main limitation is that measurements are not compound-specific. Recently PIDs with pre-filter tubes have been introduced that enhance the specificity for such compounds as benzene or butadiene. Fixed, hand-held and miniature clothing-clipped PIDs are widely used for industrial hygiene, hazmat, and environmental monitoring.

=== Infrared point ===
Infrared (IR) point sensors use radiation passing through a known volume of gas; energy from the sensor beam is absorbed at certain wavelengths, depending on the properties of the specific gas. For example, carbon monoxide absorbs wavelengths of about 4.2-4.5 μm. The energy in this wavelength is compared to a wavelength outside of the absorption range; the difference in energy between these two wavelengths is proportional to the concentration of gas present.

This type of sensor is advantageous because it does not have to be placed into the gas to detect it and can be used for remote sensing. Infrared point sensors can be used to detect hydrocarbons and other infrared active gases such as water vapor and carbon dioxide. IR sensors are commonly found in waste-water treatment facilities, refineries, gas turbines, chemical plants, and other facilities where flammable gases are present and the possibility of an explosion exists. The remote sensing capability allows large volumes of space to be monitored.

Engine emissions are another area where IR sensors are being researched. The sensor would detect high levels of carbon monoxide or other abnormal gases in vehicle exhaust and even be integrated with vehicle electronic systems to notify drivers.

=== Infrared imaging ===
Infrared image sensors include active and passive systems. For active sensing, IR imaging sensors typically scan a laser across the field of view of a scene and look for backscattered light at the absorption line wavelength of a specific target gas. Passive IR imaging sensors measure spectral changes at each pixel in an image and look for specific spectral signatures that indicate the presence of target gases. The types of compounds that can be imaged are the same as those that can be detected with infrared point detectors, but the images may be helpful in identifying the source of a gas.

=== Semiconductor ===
Semiconductor gas sensors, most commonly metal–oxide–semiconductor (MOS) sensors, detect gases by a chemical reaction that takes place when the gas comes in direct contact with the surface of the sensing element, which is usually heated to temperatures between 200 °C and 500 °C. Tin dioxide is the most common material used in semiconductor gas sensors, and the electrical resistance in the sensor is decreased when it comes in contact with the monitored gas. The resistance of the tin dioxide layer, typically in the range of 10 to 500 kΩ in air, can drop to a small fraction of this value in the presence of a reducing gas. This change in resistance (often together with signals of other sensors, e.g. humidity sensor values, for cross-sensitivity compensation) is used to calculate the gas concentration. Semiconductor gas sensors are commonly used to detect hydrogen, alcohol vapor, and harmful gases such as carbon monoxide. One of the most common uses for semiconductor gas sensors is in carbon monoxide sensors. They are also used in breathalyzers. Because the sensor must come in contact with the gas to detect it, semiconductor gas sensors work over a smaller distance than infrared point or ultrasonic detectors.

MOS sensors can detect different gases, such as carbon monoxide, sulfur dioxide, hydrogen sulfide, and ammonia. Since the 1990s, MOS sensors have become important environmental gas detectors. MOS sensors although very versatile, suffer from the problem of cross sensitivity with humidity and other gases. The cause for humidity cross-sensitivity has been attributed to interaction of hydroxyl ions with the oxide surface. Such interferences can be reduced using algorithmic optimizations and temperature-cycled operation.

=== Ultrasonic ===
Ultrasonic gas leak detectors are not gas detectors per se. They detect the acoustic emission created when a pressured gas expands in a low pressure area through a small orifice (the leak). They use acoustic sensors to detect changes in the background noise of its environment. Since most high-pressure gas leaks generate sound in the ultrasonic range of 25 kHz to 10 MHz, the sensors are able to easily distinguish these frequencies from background acoustic noise which occurs in the audible range of 20 Hz to 20 kHz. The ultrasonic gas leak detector then produces an alarm when there is an ultrasonic deviation from the normal condition of background noise. Ultrasonic gas leak detectors cannot measure gas concentration, but the device is able to determine the leak rate of an escaping gas because the ultrasonic sound level depends on the gas pressure and size of the leak.

Ultrasonic gas detectors are mainly used for remote sensing in outdoor environments where weather conditions can easily dissipate escaping gas before allowing it to reach leak detectors that require contact with the gas to detect it and sound an alarm. These detectors are commonly found on offshore and onshore oil/gas platforms, gas compressor and metering stations, gas turbine power plants, and other facilities that house a lot of outdoor pipeline.

=== Holographic ===
Holographic gas sensors use light reflection to detect changes in a polymer film matrix containing a hologram. Since holograms reflect light at certain wavelengths, a change in their composition can generate a colorful reflection indicating the presence of a gas molecule. However, holographic sensors require illumination sources such as white light or lasers, and an observer or CCD detector.

== Calibration ==
All gas detectors must be calibrated on a schedule. Of the two form factors of gas detectors, portables must be calibrated more frequently due to the regular changes in environment they experience. A typical calibration schedule for a fixed system may be quarterly, bi-annually or even annually with more robust units. A typical calibration schedule for a portable gas detector is a daily "bump test" accompanied by a monthly calibration. Almost every portable gas detector requires a specific calibration gas In the US, the Occupational Safety and Health Administration (OSHA) may set minimum standards for periodic recalibration.

=== Challenge (bump) test ===
Because a gas detector is used for employee/worker safety, it is very important to make sure it is operating to manufacturer's specifications. Australian standards specify that a person operating any gas detector is strongly advised to check the gas detector's performance each day and that it is maintained and used in accordance with the manufacturers instructions and warnings.

A challenge test should consist of exposing the gas detector to a known concentration of gas to ensure that the gas detector will respond and that the audible and visual alarms activate. It is also important to inspect the gas detector for any accidental or deliberate damage by checking that the housing and screws are intact to prevent any liquid ingress and that the filter is clean, all of which can affect the functionality of the gas detector. The basic calibration or challenge test kit will consist of calibration gas/regulator/calibration cap and hose (generally supplied with the gas detector) and a case for storage and transport. Because 1 in every 2,500 untested instruments will fail to respond to a dangerous concentration of gas, many large businesses use an automated test/calibration station for bump tests and calibrate their gas detectors daily.

== Oxygen concentration ==
Oxygen deficiency gas monitors are used for employee and workforce safety. Cryogenic substances such as liquid nitrogen (LN2), liquid helium (He), and liquid argon (Ar) are inert and can displace oxygen (O_{2}) in a confined space if a leak is present. A rapid decrease of oxygen can provide a very dangerous environment for employees, who may not notice this problem before they suddenly lose consciousness. With this in mind, an oxygen gas monitor is important to have when cryogenics are present. Laboratories, MRI rooms, pharmaceutical, semiconductor, and cryogenic suppliers are typical users of oxygen monitors.

Oxygen fraction in a breathing gas is measured by electro-galvanic oxygen sensors. They may be used stand-alone, for example to determine the proportion of oxygen in a nitrox mixture used in scuba diving, or as part of feedback loop which maintains a constant partial pressure of oxygen in a rebreather.

== Ammonia ==
Gaseous ammonia is continuously monitored in industrial refrigeration processes and biological degradation processes, including exhaled breath. Depending on the required sensitivity, different types of sensors are used (e.g., flame ionization detector, semiconductor, electrochemical, photonic membranes). Detectors usually operate near the lower exposure limit of 25ppm; however, ammonia detection for industrial safety requires continuous monitoring above the fatal exposure limit of 0.1%.

== Hydrogen ==
Hydrogen is a highly explosive material when its concentration exceed 4%, making it a safety hazard. It is therefore crucial to monitor its concentration continuously. Developing highly sensitive and reliable hydrogen gas sensors is crucial for early detection, enabling real-time monitoring and triggering alarms before dangerous concentrations are reached. These sensors play a critical role in ensuring the safe use of hydrogen across various applications, from fuel cells to industrial processes.

Many sensor candidates have been suggested including electrical, optical, acoustical...

The main principle behind hydrogen gas sensors is to integrate a catalytic material that undergoes changes in its physical properties when exposed to hydrogen. These changes can manifest in various ways, such as shifts in the material's work function or alterations in its surface plasmon resonance. Catalytic materials like Palladium and Platinum are commonly used due to their high sensitivity to hydrogen. When hydrogen molecules interact with these metals, they dissociate and are absorbed, causing changes in electrical or optical characteristics. These shifts are then detected and translated into a measurable signal, allowing for the accurate monitoring of hydrogen concentrations in real-time.

== Combustibles ==
- Catalytic bead sensor
- Explosimeter
- Infrared point sensor
- Infrared open path detector

== Other ==
- Flame ionization detector
- Nondispersive infrared sensor
- Photoionization detector
- Zirconium oxide sensor cell
- Catalytic sensors
- Metal oxide semiconductor
- Gold film
- Colorimetric detector tubes
- Sample collection and chemical analysis
- Piezoelectric microcantilever
- Holographic sensor
- Thermal conductivity detector
- Electrochemical gas sensor

== Household safety ==
There are several different sensors that can be installed to detect hazardous gases in a residence. Carbon monoxide is a very dangerous, but odorless, colorless gas, making it difficult for humans to detect. Carbon monoxide detectors can be purchased for around US$20–60. Many local jurisdictions in the United States now require installation of carbon monoxide detectors in addition to smoke detectors in residences.

Handheld flammable gas detectors can be used to trace leaks from natural gas lines, propane tanks, butane tanks, or any other combustible gas. These sensors can be purchased for US$35–100.

== Research ==
The European Community has supported research called the MINIGAS project that was coordinated by VTT Technical Research Center of Finland. This research project aims to develop new types of photonics-based gas sensors, and to support the creation of smaller instruments with equal or higher speed and sensitivity than conventional laboratory-grade gas detectors.

== See also ==
- Gas leak
- Hydrogen sensor
- List of sensors
