= Carbon dioxide recorder =

Carbon dioxide monitoring instrument

A carbon dioxide recorder (or CO_{2} recorder) is a machine that can record the level of carbon dioxide at different times. It is more sophisticated than a carbon dioxide detector which only has to indicate the presence of carbon dioxide. There are three main types of carbon dioxide recorder: chemical, physical, and electrical.

== Mechanism ==
=== Chemical ===
The chemical carbon dioxide recorder, sucks the gas through a chemical that absorbs carbon dioxide. They include the Simmance combustion recorder; Hays automatic CO_{2} recorder, and electroflo CO_{2} recorder.

The Arndt carbon dioxide recorder used a potassium hydroxide solution to absorb carbon dioxide.

The Uehling recorder uses the chemical, sodium hydroxide to absorb the carbon dioxide, and measures the change in volume of the gas.

=== Physical ===
The physical carbon dioxide recorder, includes Webster CO_{2} recorder. The Remarex carbon dioxide recorder uses vanes spinning in the gas under test and the air.

=== Electrical ===
Electrical recorders use a thermal conductivity method, where the resistance of a heated wire is measured.

== Form ==
Carbon dioxide recorders can be handheld, or wall mount. They can have an audible or light indicator alarm if level is too high. Units can also measure humidity and temperature.

== Application ==
Carbon dioxide recorders have been used in schools and hospitals to determine whether enough fresh air is being circulated. A carbon dioxide recorder can be used to measure the composition of flue gas to check if combustion is at its most efficient. In agriculture, they can be used to measure levels of carbon dioxide in greenhouses, where the levels are deliberately elevated.

== See also ==
- Explosive gas leak detector
