= Joshua Sieger =

Joshua Sieger CBE (5 January 1907 – 1 March 1993) was an English scientist and engineer.

Joshua Sieger, the founder of the gas detection brand J&S Sieger (now known as Honeywell Analytics) played a pivotal role in the development of gas detection technology and made significant contributions to various communication technologies. His influence extended across multiple industries, contributing to technological progress in areas such as television, radar, and gas detection.

He was appointed an Officer of the Order of the British Empire (OBE) in the 1970 Birthday Honours and a Commander of the Order of the British Empire (CBE) in the 1981 Birthday Honours.
