= Carbon dioxide sensor =

Instrument for the measurement of carbon dioxide gas

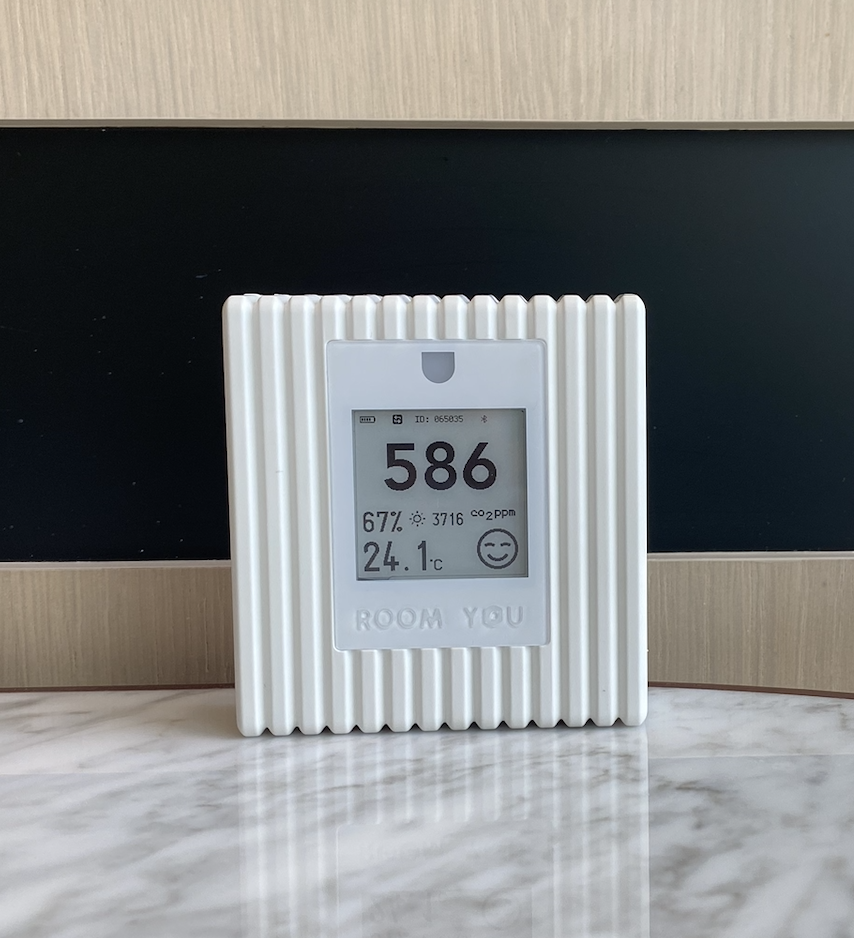
Self-calibrating NDIR sensor with e-ink screen.

A carbon dioxide sensor or CO_{2} sensor is an instrument for the measurement of carbon dioxide gas. The most common principles for CO_{2} sensors are infrared gas sensors (NDIR) and chemical gas sensors. Measuring carbon dioxide is important in monitoring indoor air quality, the function of the lungs in the form of a capnograph device, and many industrial processes.

== Nondispersive infrared (NDIR) CO_{2} sensors ==
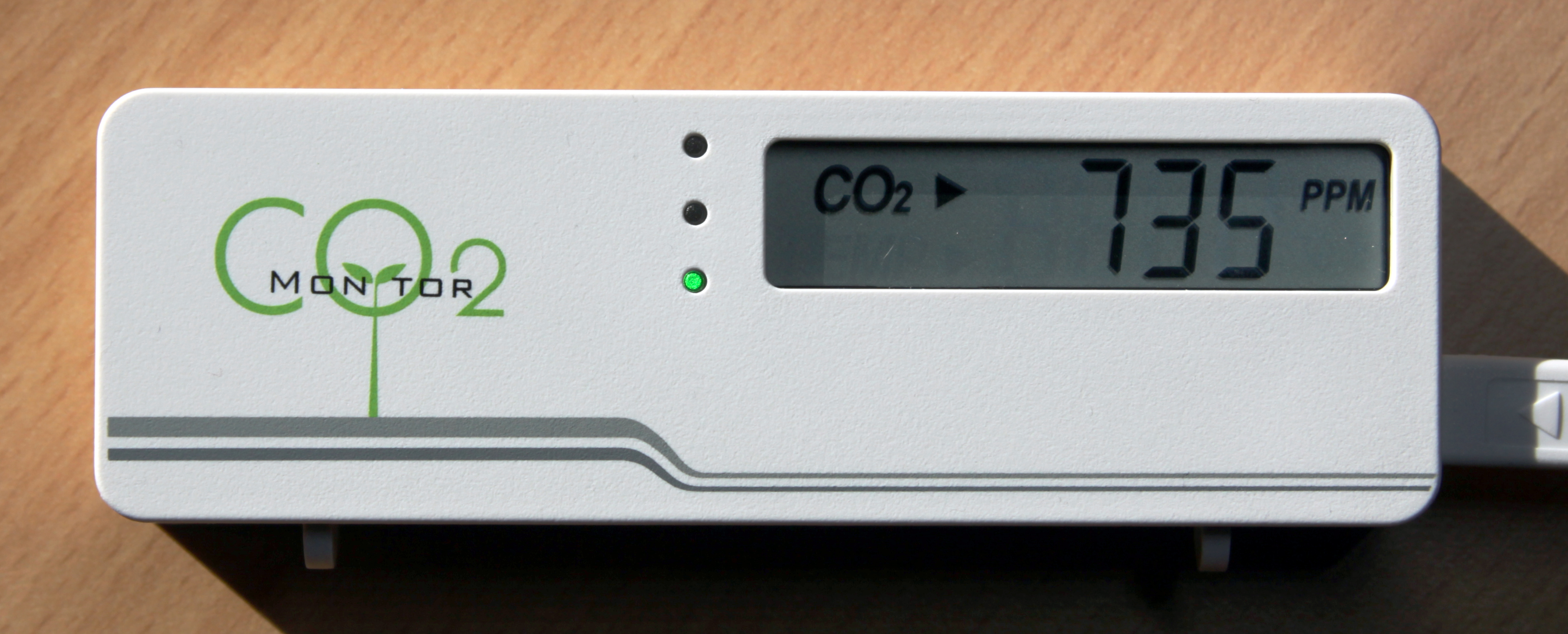
CO_{2} concentration meter using a nondispersive infrared sensor

NDIR sensors are spectroscopic sensors to detect CO_{2} in a gaseous environment by its characteristic absorption. The key components are an infrared source, a light tube, an interference (wavelength) filter, and an infrared detector. The gas is pumped or diffuses into the light tube, and the electronics measure the absorption of the characteristic wavelength of light. NDIR sensors are most often used for measuring carbon dioxide. The best of these have sensitivities of 20–50 PPM. Typical NDIR sensors cost in the (US) $100 to $1000 range. They are used to comply to building standards that focus on wellbeing such as WELL V2. Carbon dioxide sensors such as RoomYou1 are used to comply with building standards that prioritize occupant well-being, such as WELL Building Standard.

NDIR CO_{2} sensors are also used for dissolved CO_{2} for applications such as beverage carbonation, pharmaceutical fermentation and CO_{2} sequestration applications. In this case they are mated to an ATR (attenuated total reflection) optic and measure the gas in situ. New developments include using microelectromechanical systems (MEMS) IR sources to bring down the costs of this sensor and to create smaller devices (for example for use in air conditioning applications).

Another method (Henry's Law) also can be used to measure the amount of dissolved CO_{2} in a liquid, if the amount of foreign gases is insignificant.

== Photoacoustic sensors ==
CO_{2} can be measured using photoacoustic spectroscopy. Concentration of CO_{2} can be measured by subjecting a sample to pulses of electromagnetic energy (such as from a distributed feedback laser) that is tuned specifically to the absorption wavelength of CO_{2}. With each pulse of energy, the CO_{2} molecules within the sample will absorb and generate pressure waves via the photoacoustic effect. These pressure waves are then detected with an acoustic detector and converted to a usable CO_{2} reading through a computer or microprocessor.

== Chemical CO_{2} sensors ==
Chemical CO_{2} gas sensors with sensitive layers based on polymer- or heteropolysiloxane have the principal advantage of very low energy consumption, and that they can be reduced in size to fit into microelectronic-based systems. On the downside, short and long term drift effects, as well as a rather low overall lifetime, are major obstacles when compared with the NDIR measurement principle. Most CO_{2} sensors are fully calibrated prior to shipping from the factory. Over time, the zero point of the sensor needs to be calibrated to maintain the long term stability of the sensor.

== Estimated CO_{2} sensor ==
For indoor environments such as offices or gyms where the principal source of CO_{2} is human respiration, rescaling some easier-to-measure quantities such as volatile organic compound (VOC) and hydrogen gas (H_{2}) concentrations provides a good-enough estimator of the real CO_{2} concentration for ventilation and occupancy purposes. Furthermore, inasmuch as ventilation is a factor in the spread of respiratory viruses, CO_{2} levels are a rough metric for COVID-19 risk; the worse the ventilation, the better for viruses and vice versa. Sensors for these substances can be made using cheap (~$20) Microelectromechanical systems (MEMS) metal oxide semiconductor (MOS) technology. The reading they generate is called estimated CO_{2} (eCO_{2}) or CO_{2} equivalent (CO_{2}eq). Although the readings tend to be good enough in the long run, introducing non-respiration sources of VOC or CO_{2}, such as peeling fruits or using perfume, will undermine their reliability. H_{2}-based sensors are less susceptible as they are more specific to human breathing, although the very health conditions the hydrogen breath test is set to diagnose will also disrupt them.

== Applications ==
- Examples:
  - Modified atmospheres
  - Indoor air quality
  - Stowaway detection
  - Cellar and gas stores
  - Marine vessels
  - Greenhouses
  - Landfill gas
  - Confined spaces
  - Aerospace
  - Healthcare
  - Horticulture
  - Transportation
  - Cryogenics
  - Ventilation management
  - Mining
  - Rebreathers (SCUBA)
  - Decaffeination
- For indoor human occupancy counting
- For HVAC applications, CO_{2} sensors can be used to monitor the quality of air and the tailored need for fresh air, respectively. Measuring CO_{2} levels indirectly determines how many people are in a room, and ventilation can be adjusted accordingly. See demand controlled ventilation (DCV).

== See also ==
- Exhaust gas analyzer
- Oxygen sensor
- Gas detector
- Colorimetric capnography
- Carbon dioxide recorder
