= Electrochemical gas sensor =

Electrochemical gas sensors are gas detectors that measure the concentration of a target gas by oxidizing or reducing the target gas at an electrode and measuring the resulting current.

== History ==
Beginning his research in 1962, Mr. Naoyoshi Taguchi became the first person in the world to develop a semiconductor device that could detect low concentrations of combustible and reducing gases when used with a simple electrical circuit. Devices based on this technology are often called "TGS" (Taguchi Gas Sensors).

== Construction ==
The sensors contain two or three electrodes, occasionally four, in contact with an electrolyte. The electrodes are typically fabricated by fixing a high surface area of precious metal onto the porous hydrophobic membrane. The working electrode contacts both the electrolyte and the ambient air to be monitored, usually via a porous membrane. The electrolyte most commonly used is a mineral acid, but organic electrolytes are also used for some sensors. The electrodes and housing are usually in a plastic housing which contains a gas entry hole for the gas and electrical contacts.

== Theory of operation ==
The gas diffuses into the sensor, through the back of the porous membrane to the working electrode, where it is oxidized or reduced. This electrochemical reaction results in an electric current that passes through the external circuit. In addition to measuring, amplifying, and performing other signal processing functions, the external circuit maintains the voltage across the sensor between the working and counter electrodes for a two-electrode sensor or between the working and reference electrodes for a three-electrode cell. At the counter electrode, an equal and opposite reaction occurs, such that if the working electrode is an oxidation, then the counter electrode is a reduction.

== Diffusion controlled response ==
The magnitude of the current is controlled by how much of the target gas is oxidized at the working electrode. Sensors are usually designed so that the gas supply is limited by diffusion, and thus the output from the sensor is linearly proportional to the gas concentration. This linear output is one of the advantages of electrochemical sensors over other sensor technologies (e.g. infrared), whose output must be linearized before they can be used. A linear output allows for more precise measurement of low concentrations and much simpler calibration (only a baseline and one point are needed).

Diffusion control offers another advantage. Changing the diffusion barrier allows the sensor manufacturer to tailor the sensor to a particular target gas concentration range. In addition, since the diffusion barrier is primarily mechanical, the calibration of electrochemical sensors tends to be more stable over time and so electrochemical sensor-based instruments require much less maintenance than some other detection technologies. In principle, the sensitivity can be calculated based on the diffusion properties of the gas path into the sensor, though experimental errors in the measurement of the diffusion properties make the calculation less accurate than calibrating with test gas.

== Cross sensitivity ==
For some gases, such as ethylene oxide, cross-sensitivity can be a problem because ethylene oxide requires a very active working electrode catalyst and high operating potential for its oxidation. Therefore, gases that are more easily oxidized, such as alcohols and carbon monoxide will also give a response. Cross-sensitivity problems can be eliminated through the use of a chemical filter, for example, filters that allow the target gas to pass through unimpeded but which reacts with and removes common interferences.

While electrochemical sensors offer many advantages, they are not suitable for every gas. Since the detection mechanism involves the oxidation or reduction of the gas, electrochemical sensors are usually only suitable for electrochemically active gases, though it is possible to detect electrochemically inert gases indirectly if the gas interacts with another species in the sensor that then produces a response. Sensors for carbon dioxide are an example of this approach and they have been commercially available for several years.

Cross-sensitivity of electronic chemical sensors may also be utilized to design chemical sensor arrays, which utilize a variety of specific sensors that are cross-reactive for fingerprint detection of target gases in complex mixtures.

== See also ==
- Carbon monoxide detector
- Karlsruhe Institute of Technology (KIT) - Forschungsstelle für Brandschutztechnik: KAMINA - gas sensor microarrays for rapid smoke analysis
- Gas diffusion electrode
