= Nondispersive infrared sensor =

Spectroscopic sensor

A nondispersive infrared sensor (or NDIR sensor) is a simple spectroscopic sensor often used as a gas detector. It is non-dispersive in the sense that no dispersive element (e.g., a prism, or diffraction grating, as is often present in other spectrometers) is used to separate (like a monochromator) the broadband light into a narrow spectrum suitable for gas sensing. The majority of NDIR sensors use a broadband lamp source and an optical filter to select a narrow band spectral region that correspond to the absorption region of the gas of interest. In this context, the narrow band can be 50-300 nm bandwidth. Modern NDIR sensors may use microelectromechanical systems (MEMs) or mid IR LED sources, with or without an optical filter.

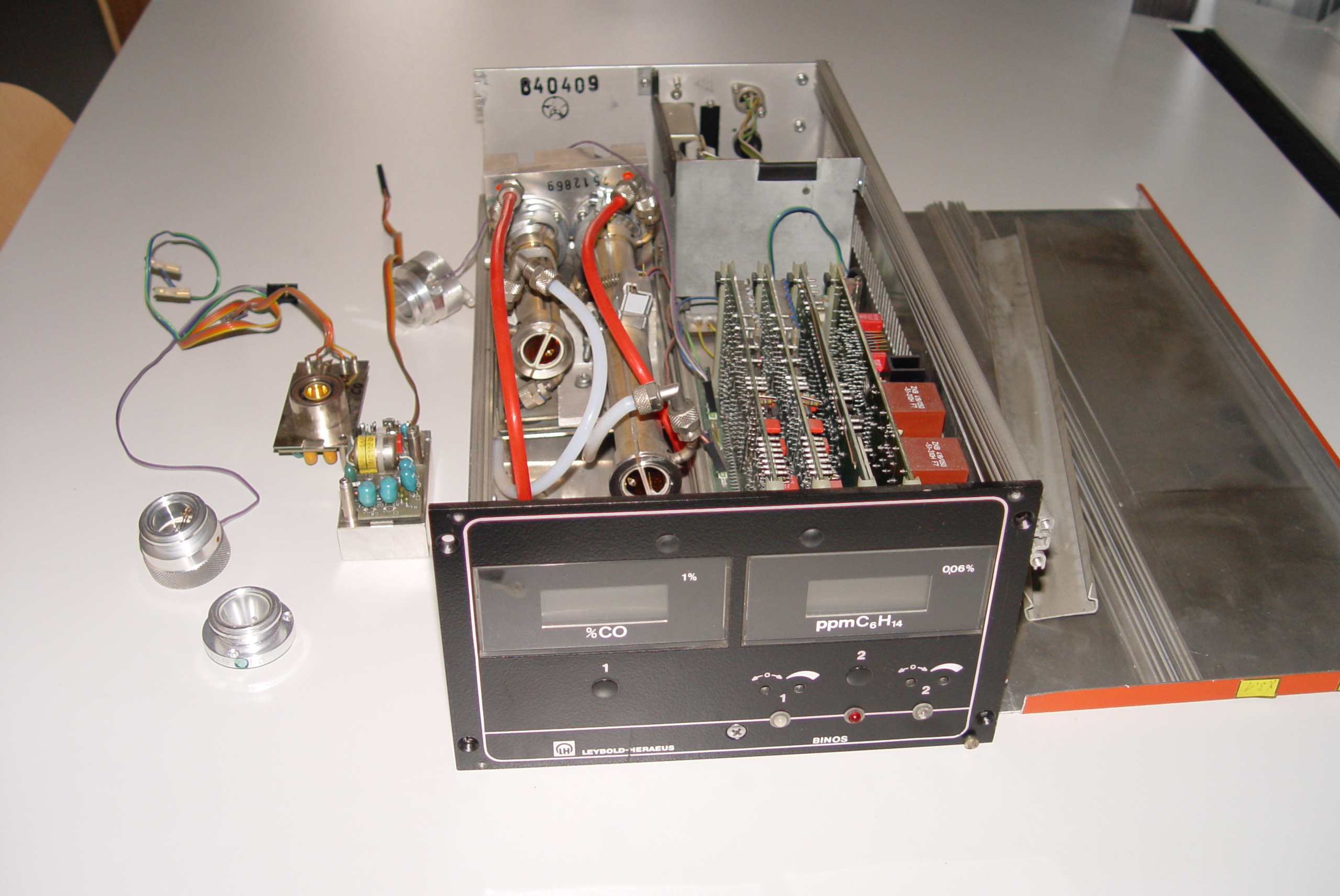
NDIR-analyzer with one double tube for CO and another double tube for hydrocarbons

== Principle ==
The main components of an NDIR sensor are an infrared (IR) source (lamp), a sample chamber or light tube, a light filter and an infrared detector. The IR light is directed through the sample chamber towards the detector. In parallel there is another chamber with an enclosed reference gas, typically nitrogen. The gas in the sample chamber causes absorption of specific wavelengths according to the Beer–Lambert law, and the attenuation of these wavelengths is measured by the detector to determine the gas concentration. The detector has an optical filter in front of it that eliminates all light except the wavelength that the selected gas molecules can absorb.

Ideally, other gas molecules do not absorb light at this wavelength, and do not affect the amount of light reaching the detector; however some cross-sensitivity is inevitable. For instance, many measurements in the IR area are cross sensitive to H_{2}O so gases like CO_{2}, SO_{2} and NO_{2} often initiate cross sensitivity in low concentrations.

The IR signal from the source is usually chopped or modulated so that thermal background signals can be offset from the desired signal.

NDIR sensors for carbon dioxide are often installed in heating, ventilation, and air conditioning (HVAC) units.

Configurations with multiple filters, either on individual sensors or on a rotating wheel, allow simultaneous measurement at several selected wavelengths.

Fourier transform infrared spectroscopy (FTIR), a more complex technology, scans a wide part of the spectrum, measuring many absorbing species simultaneously.

=== Research ===
Miniature IR sources based on microelectromechanical systems (MEMS) have been experimentally applied to NDIR systems since 2006 and are useful since 2016. The low energy of MEMS emission means a sensitive detector circuit based on lock-in amplification is needed. Other useful detectors include the photoacoustic gas sensor which use a MEMS microphone to detect IR-gas interactions.

== Gases and their sensing wavelengths ==
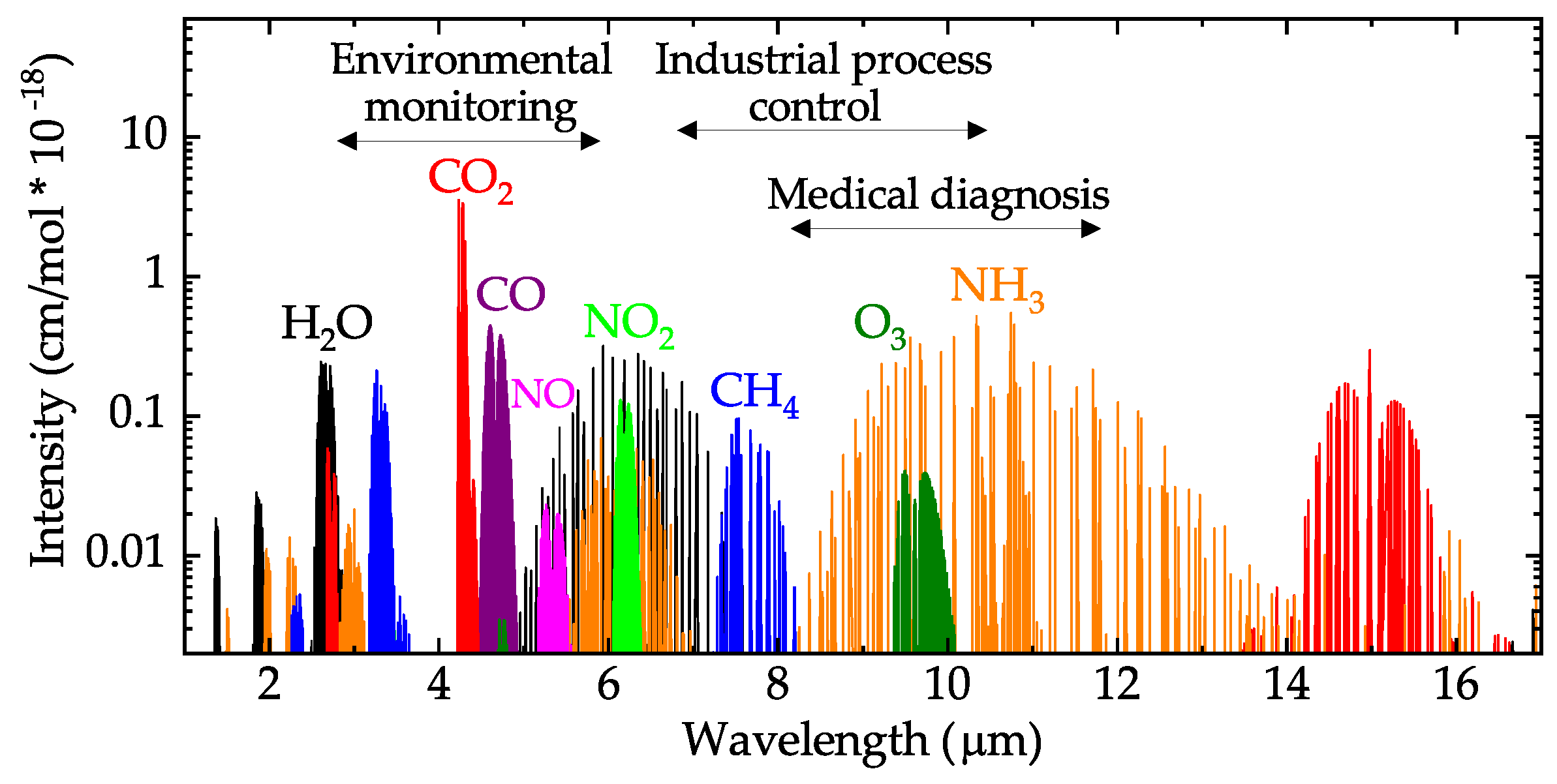
Mid-infrared absorption spectra of some gases

Gases do not have a specific sensing wavelength, rather there are regions of the IR spectrum where there are typically many thousands of closely spaced absorption lines. See the Hitran database for more information.

- O_{2} — 0.763 μm
- CO_{2} — 4.26 μm, 2.7 μm, about 13 μm
- CO — 4.67 μm, 1.55 μm, 2.33 μm, 4.6 μm, 4.8 μm, 5.9 μm
- NO — 5.3 μm, NO_{2} has to be reduced to NO and then they are measured together as NO_{x}; NO also absorbs in ultraviolet at 195-230 nm, NO_{2} is measured at 350-450 nm; in situations where NO_{2} content is known to be low, it is often ignored and only NO is measured; also, 1.8 μm
- NO_{2} — 6.17-6.43 μm, 15.4-16.3 μm, 496 nm
- N_{2}O — 7.73 μm (NO_{2} and SO_{2} interfere), 1.52 μm, 4.3 μm, 4.4 μm, about 8 μm
- HNO_{3} — 5.81 μm
- NH_{3} — 2.25 μm, 3.03 μm, 5.7 μm
- H_{2}S — 1.57 μm, 3.72 μm, 3.83 μm
- SO_{2} — 7.35 μm, 19.25 μm
- HF — 1.27 μm, 1.33 μm
- HCl — 3.4 μm
- HBr — 1.34 μm, 3.77 μm
- HI — 4.39 μm
- hydrocarbons — 3.3-3.5 μm, the C-H bond vibration
- CH_{4} — 3.33 μm, 7.91±0.16 μm can also be used, 1.3 μm, 1.65 μm, 2.3 μm, 3.2-3.5 μm, about 7.7 μm
- C_{2}H_{2} — 3.07 μm
- C_{3}H_{8} — 1.68 μm, 3.3 μm
- CH_{3}Cl — 3.29 μm
- H_{2}O — 1.94 μm, 2.9 μm (CO_{2} interferes), 5.78±0.18 μm can also be used to avoid interference from CO_{2}, 1.3 μm, 1.4 μm, 1.8 μm
- O_{3} — 9.0 μm, also 254 nm (UV)
- H_{2}O_{2} — 7.79 μm
- alcohol mixtures — 9.5±0.45 μm
- HCHO — 3.6 μm
- HCOOH — 8.98 μm
- COS — 4.87 μm

== Applications ==
- Infrared gas analyzer
- Infrared point sensor
- Carbon dioxide sensor
