= Infrared point sensor =

Point gas detector

An infrared point sensor or point infrared (IR) detector is a type gas detector that uses infrared absorption at specific wavelengths to detect changes in gas composition in air. Gases that can be detected include hydrocarbons, allowing infrared point detectors to be used in safety applications to detect the presence of flammable gases at low levels and shut down equipment as needed to prevent fire or explosion.

== Principle ==
Dual source and dual receivers are used for self compensation of changes in alignment, light source intensity and component efficiency. The transmitted beams from two infrared sources are superimposed onto an internal beam splitter. 50% of the overlapping sample and reference signal is passed through the gas measuring path and reflected back onto the measuring detector. The presence of combustible gas will reduce the intensity of the sample beam and not the reference beam, with the difference between these two signals being proportional to the concentration of gas present in the measuring path. The other 50% of the overlapped signal passes through the beam splitter and onto the compensation detector. The compensation detector monitors the intensity of the two infrared sources and automatically compensates for any long term drift.

Mean time between failures may go up to 15 years.

== Micro heaters ==
Micro heaters can be used to raise the temperature from optical surfaces above ambient to enhance performance and to prevent condensation on the optical surfaces.

== Range ==
Toxic gases are measured in the low parts per million (ppm) range. Flammable gases are measured in the 0 - 100% lower flammable limit (LFL) or lower explosive limit (LEL) range.

== See also ==
- List of sensors
- Maintenance-free operating period
- Service life
- ATEX directive II 1G EEx ia IIC T6
- Infrared gas analyzer - for gas monitoring and analysis, rather than leak detection.
