= Cleveland open-cup method =

Method for determining the flash point of a petroleum product

The Cleveland open-cup method is one of three main methods in chemistry for determining the flash point of a petroleum product using a Cleveland open-cup apparatus, also known as a Cleveland open-cup tester. First, the test cup of the apparatus (usually brass) is filled to a certain level with a portion of the product. Then, the temperature of this chemical is increased rapidly and then at a slow, constant rate as it approaches the theoretical flash point. The increase in temperature will cause the chemical to begin to produce flammable vapor in increasing quantities and density. The lowest temperature at which a small test flame passing over the surface of the liquid causes the vapor to ignite is considered the chemical's flash point. This apparatus may also be used to determine the chemical's fire point which is considered to have been reached when the application of the test flame produces at least five continuous seconds of ignition. Temperature range of this apparatus is 120 to 250 °C (248 to 482 °F).

The other principal methods of establishing chemical flash points are the Pensky–Martens closed-cup test and the Tagliabue cup method (often called simply the "Tag method").
