= Fire point =

Lowest temperature at which a fuel will burn continuously

The fire point, or combustion point, of a fuel is the lowest temperature at which the liquid fuel will continue to burn for at least five seconds after ignition by an open flame of standard dimension. At the flash point, a lower temperature, a substance will ignite briefly, but vapour might not be produced at a rate to sustain the fire. Most tables of material properties will only list material flash points. In general, the fire point can be assumed to be about 10 °C higher than the flash point, although this is no substitute for testing if the fire point is safety critical.

Testing of the fire point is done by open cup apparatus.

== See also ==
- Autoignition temperature
- Flash point
