= Catalytic bead sensor =

A catalytic bead sensor is a type of sensor that is used for combustible gas detection from the family of gas sensors known as pellistors.

== Principle ==
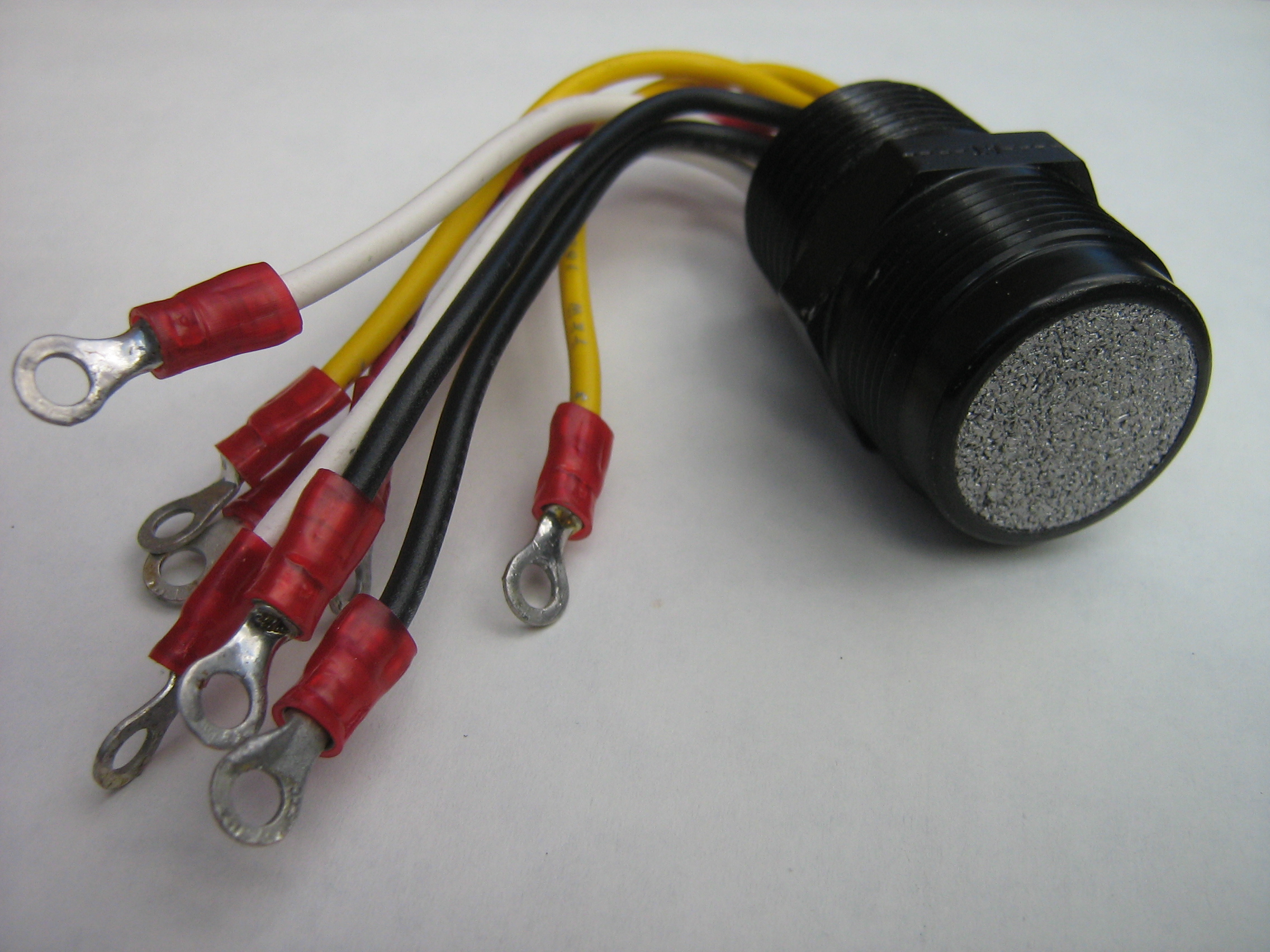
The catalytic bead sensor MSA 94150

The catalytic bead sensor consists of two coils of fine platinum wire each embedded in a bead of alumina, connected electrically in a Wheatstone bridge circuit. One of the pellistors is impregnated with a special catalyst which promotes oxidation whilst the other is treated to inhibit oxidation. Current is passed through the coils so that they reach a temperature at which oxidation of a gas readily occurs at the catalysed bead (500-550 °C). Passing combustible gas raises the temperature further which increases the resistance of the platinum coil in the catalysed bead, leading to an imbalance of the bridge. This output change is linear, for most gases, up to and beyond 100% LEL, response time is a few seconds to detect alarm levels (around 20% LEL), at least 12% oxygen by volume is needed for the oxidation.

== Issues ==
- Catalyst poisoning - because of the direct contact of the gas with the catalytic surface it may be deactivated in some circumstances.
- Sensor drift - Decreased sensitivity may occur depending on operating and ambient conditions.
- Modes of failure - which include poisoning and sinter blockage, they become apparent during routine maintenance checking.

== See also ==
- List of sensors
