= Autoignition temperature =

Lowest temperature at which a substance spontaneously combusts

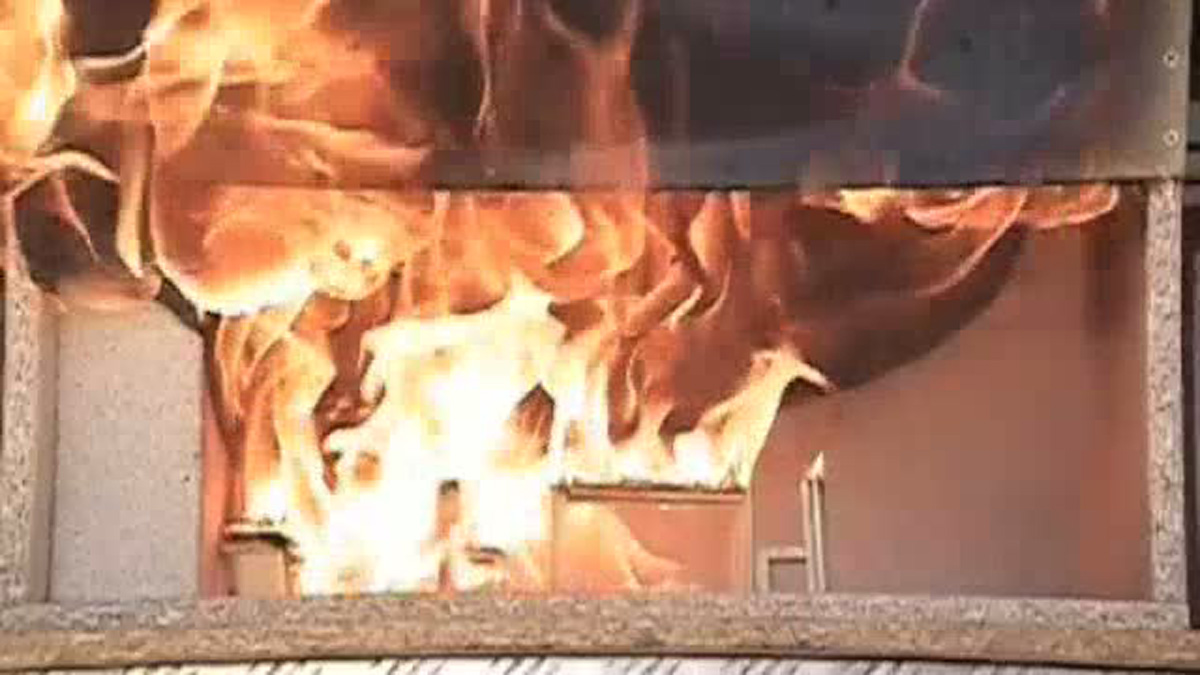
A flashover occurs when most combustible material reach their autoignition temperature in an enclosed space

The autoignition temperature (often called self-ignition temperature, spontaneous ignition temperature, minimum ignition temperature, or shortly ignition temperature, formerly also known as kindling point) of a substance is the lowest temperature at which it spontaneously ignites in a normal atmosphere without an external source of ignition, such as a flame or spark. This temperature is required to supply the activation energy needed for combustion. The temperature at which a chemical ignites decreases as the pressure is decreased.

Substances which spontaneously ignite in a normal atmosphere at naturally ambient temperatures are termed pyrophoric.

Autoignition temperatures of liquid chemicals are typically measured using a 500-millilitre (18 imp fl oz; 17 US fl oz) flask placed in a temperature-controlled oven in accordance with the procedure described in ASTM E659.

When measured for plastics, autoignition temperature can also be measured under elevated pressure and at 100% oxygen concentration. The resulting value is used as a predictor of viability for high-oxygen service. The main testing standard for this is ASTM G72.

== Autoignition time equation ==
The time $t_\text{ig}$ it takes for a material to reach its autoignition temperature $T_\text{ig}$ when exposed to a heat flux $q''$ is given by the following equation:
$$t_\text{ig} = \frac{\pi}{4} k \rho c \left [ \frac{T_\text{ig} - T_0}{q''} \right]^2,$$
where k = thermal conductivity, ρ = density, and c = specific heat capacity of the material of interest, $T_0$ is the initial temperature of the material (or the temperature of the bulk material).

== Autoignition temperature of selected substances ==
Temperatures vary widely across the literature and should be treated as estimates. Factors that may cause variation include the partial pressure of oxygen, altitude, humidity, and the time required for ignition. Generally, and counter-intuitively, the autoignition temperature for hydrocarbon/air mixtures decreases with increasing molecular mass and increasing chain length. The autoignition temperature is also higher for branched-chain hydrocarbons than for straight-chain hydrocarbons. Besides the thermal conductivity, density, and specific heat capacity of the substance, influencing the autoignition time, as explained in the section above, another possible reason could be sought in the heat of evaporation, which cools volatile, lighter liquid hydrocarbons, as long as a liquid phase is still present in the system to lower its temperature below the autoignition point.

Substance	Autoignition^{[D]}	Note
Barium	550 °C (1,022 °F)	550±90^{[C]}
Bismuth	735 °C (1,355 °F)	735±20^{[C]}
Butane	405 °C (761 °F)	
Calcium	790 °C (1,450 °F)	790±10^{[C]}
Carbon disulfide	90 °C (194 °F)	
Diesel or Jet A-1	210 °C (410 °F)	
Diethyl ether	160 °C (320 °F)	
Ethanol	365 °C (689 °F)	
Gasoline (Petrol)	247–280 °C (477–536 °F)	
Hydrogen	535 °C (995 °F)	
Iron	1,315 °C (2,399 °F)	1315±20^{[C]}
Lead	850 °C (1,560 °F)	850±5^{[C]}
Leather / parchment	200–212 °C (392–414 °F)	
Magnesium	635 °C (1,175 °F)	635±5^{[B]}^{[C]}
Magnesium	473 °C (883 °F)	^{[B]}
Methane	537 °C (999 °F)	
Molybdenum	780 °C (1,440 °F)	780±5^{[C]}
Paper	218–246 °C (424–475 °F)	
Phosphorus (white)	34 °C (93 °F)	^{[A]}^{[B]}
Silane	21 °C (70 °F)	or below
Strontium	1,075 °C (1,967 °F)	1075±120^{[C]}
Tin	940 °C (1,720 °F)	940±25^{[C]}
Triethylborane	−20 °C (−4 °F)	

^{A} On contact with an organic substance, melts otherwise.
^{B} There are two distinct results in the published literature. Both are separately listed in this table.
^{C} At 1 atm. The ignition temperature depends on the air pressure.
^{D} Under standard conditions for pressure.

== See also ==
- Fire point
- Flash point
- Gas burner (for flame temperatures, combustion heat energy values and ignition temperatures)
- Spontaneous combustion
