= Calibration gas =

Calibration gas is a gas or gas mixture with a known composition used as a reference standard for the calibration, adjustment, or verification of gas-measuring instruments. Such instruments include gas detectors, gas analysers, gas chromatographs, air-quality monitors, and continuous emissions monitoring systems.

Calibration gases are used to establish or verify the relationship between an instrument response and a known concentration of one or more chemical species. A calibration procedure may use a gas that contains none of the analyte of interest, commonly called a ‘‘zero gas’’, and one or more gases containing known concentrations of the analyte, commonly called ‘‘span gases’’.

== Preparation ==
Calibration gas mixtures may be prepared by static or dynamic methods. In static preparation, the components are introduced into a container, usually a compressed-gas cylinder, in controlled amounts. A common static method is gravimetric preparation, in which the masses of the components added to the cylinder are measured and used to calculate the amount fractions of the mixture.

Dynamic preparation methods generate a calibration mixture continuously by combining controlled flows of gases or vapours. These methods may be used when a mixture is unstable in storage, when several concentrations are needed from the same source gases, or when on-site generation is more practical than storing premixed cylinders.

== Certification and traceability ==
For quantitative measurements, a calibration gas is commonly supplied with a certificate stating the assigned composition, uncertainty, balance gas, cylinder identification, stability period or expiry date, and traceability information. ISO 6141 specifies requirements for certificates for homogeneous gas mixtures in cylinders used as calibration gas mixtures.

Metrological traceability means that the assigned value can be related to a recognized reference through a documented chain of calibrations or comparisons, each contributing to the stated measurement uncertainty. In the United States, the National Institute of Standards and Technology supplies gas mixture Standard Reference Materials and operates programs for NIST Traceable Reference Materials. NIST describes its gas-mixture SRM, NTRM, and EPA Protocol programs as mechanisms for producing calibration gas standards with defined traceability.

The United States Environmental Protection Agency maintains a traceability protocol for the assay and certification of gaseous calibration standards. The protocol is used to certify calibration gases for ambient air monitors and continuous emission monitors and specifies methods for establishing traceability to NIST reference standards.

== Stability and uncertainty ==
The certified value of a calibration gas may differ from its nominal concentration. Certificates therefore normally distinguish between the requested or nominal concentration, the assigned or certified concentration, and the uncertainty associated with the assigned value. The certified value, rather than the nominal value, is the value normally used in calibration records.

The composition of a calibration gas may change over time as a result of chemical reaction, adsorption on cylinder walls or regulators, leakage, contamination, or instability of reactive components. Stability depends on factors such as the analyte, concentration, balance gas, cylinder material, pressure, moisture content, and storage conditions. Reactive gases such as ammonia, hydrogen sulfide, sulfur dioxide, nitrogen dioxide, chlorine, and some volatile organic compounds may require specially treated cylinders, shorter certification periods, or dynamic generation rather than long-term storage.

== Applications ==
Calibration gases are used in environmental monitoring, industrial emissions monitoring, occupational safety, process control, laboratory analysis, fuel-gas analysis, medical testing, and forensic testing. In workplace safety programs, calibration gas is used for both full calibration and functional testing of direct-reading portable gas monitors. A functional test, often called a ‘‘bump test’’, exposes the instrument to a challenge gas to confirm that gas reaches the sensor and that alarms function, but it does not by itself measure instrument accuracy.

== Storage and handling ==
Calibration gases are usually stored as compressed gases and may be toxic, flammable, oxidizing, corrosive, or asphyxiating. Safe use requires compatible regulators, tubing, flow-control devices, ventilation, and handling procedures appropriate to the mixture. The safety data sheet and certificate supplied with the gas identify the composition, hazards, storage conditions, and certification or expiry information.

== See also ==
- Analytical chemistry
- Calibration
- Gas chromatography
- Gas detector
- Metrological traceability
- Reference material
- Standard Reference Material
