= Honeywell Analytics =

Honeywell Analytics (formerly Zellweger Analytics) is a producer of gas detectors based in Poole in the United Kingdom.

== History ==
Zellweger Analytics established its SF Detection brand in 1991 to supply domestic carbon monoxide (CO) units to consumers. The company was the first to bring a kitemarked product to market in 1996, while a subsequent model, the SF350BS released in 1998, was the first device to be approved to the new British Standard. When the European Standard governing the use of domestic CO alarms (EN50291:2001) was released in 2001, the company launched the SF350EN in 2002; the first CO alarm in the UK to be certified to the European Standard.

In 2005 Honeywell acquired the company and re-branded the organisation as Honeywell Analytics, within its Honeywell Life Safety Group. In 2007 MST Technology, a German supplier of semiconductor fabrication and laboratory based gas detection, was also acquired and integrated.
