= Infrared gas analyzer =

Scientific equipment to analyse gas composition using absorption of infrared radiation

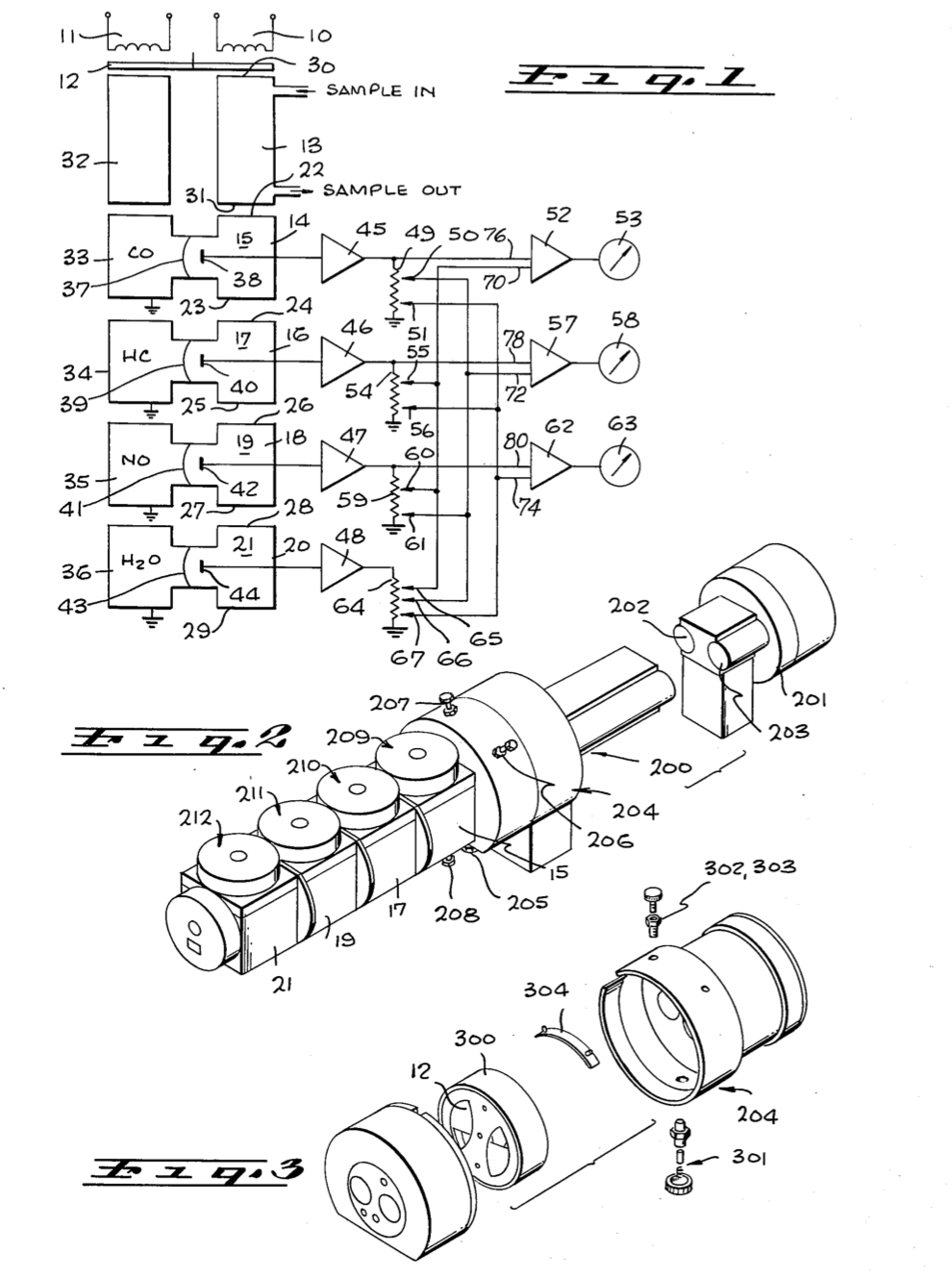
Kozo Ishida's design for an infrared gas analyzer. See it here

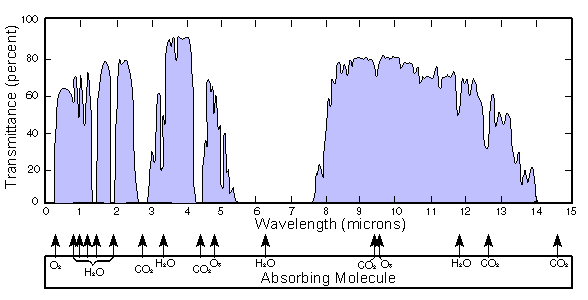
A diagram showing the wavelength at which different atmospheric gases absorb infrared radiation

An infrared gas analyzer measures trace gases by determining the absorption of an emitted infrared light source through a certain air sample. Trace gases found in the Earth's atmosphere become excited under specific wavelengths found in the infrared range. The concept behind the technology can be understood as testing how much of the light is absorbed by the air. Different molecules in the air absorb different frequencies of light. Air with much of a certain gas will absorb more of a certain frequency, allowing the sensor to report a high concentration of the corresponding molecule.

Infrared gas analyzers usually have two chambers, one is a reference chamber while the other chamber is a measurement chamber. Infrared light is emitted from some type of source on one end of the chamber, passes through a series of chambers that contains given quantities of the various gases in question.

== Principles of operation ==
The design from 1975 (pictured above) is a Nondispersive infrared sensor. It is the first improved analyzer that is able to detect more than one component of a sample gas at one time. Earlier analyzers were held back by the fact that a particular gas also has lower absorption bands in the infrared.

The invention of 1975 has as many detectors as the number of gases to be measured. Each detector has two chambers which both have an optically aligned infrared source and detector, and are both filled with one of the gases in the sample of air to be analyzed. Lying in the optical path are two cells with transparent ends. One contains a reference gas and one will contain the gas to be analyzed. Between the infrared source and the cells is a modulator which interrupts the beams of energy.

The output from each detector is combined with the output from any other detector which is measuring a signal opposite to the principal signal of each detector. The amount of signal from other detectors is the amount that will offset the proportion of the total signal that corresponds to the interference. This interference is from gases with a principal lower absorption band that is the same as the principal band of the gas being measured.

For instance, if the analyzer is to measure carbon monoxide and dioxide, the chambers must contain a certain amount of these gases. The infrared light is emitted and passes through the sample gas, a reference gas with a known mixture of the gases in question and then through the "detector" chambers containing the pure forms of the gases in question. When a "detector" chamber absorbs some of the infrared radiation, it heats up and expands. This causes a rise in pressure within the sealed vessel that can be detected either with a pressure transducer or with a similar device. The combination of output voltages from the detector chambers from the sample gas can then be compared to the output voltages from the reference chamber.

== Latest technology ==
Like earlier infrared gas analyzers, modern analyzers also use nondispersive infrared technology to detect a certain gas by detecting the absorption of infrared wavelengths that is characteristic of that gas. Infrared energy is emitted from a heated filament. By optically filtering the energy, the radiation spectrum is limited to the absorption band of the gas being measured. A detector measures the energy after the infrared energy has passed through the gas to be measured. This is compared to the energy at reference condition of no absorption.

Many analyzers are wall-mounted devices intended for long-term, unattended gas monitoring. There are now analysers that measure a range of gases and are highly portable to be suitable for a wider range of geoscience applications. Fast response high-precision analyzers are widely used to measure gas emissions and ecosystem fluxes using eddy covariance method when used together with fast-response sonic anemometer.

In some analyzers, the reliability of measurements is enhanced by calibrating the analyzer at the reference condition and a known span concentration. If the air would interfere with measurements, the chamber that houses the energy source is filled with a gas that has no detectable concentration of the gas being measured. Depending on the gas being measured, fresh air, chemically stripped air or nitrogen may be used.

== See also ==
- Nondispersive infrared sensor
- Eddy covariance
