= Holographic sensor =

A holographic sensor is a device that comprises a hologram embedded in a smart material that detects certain molecules or metabolites. This detection is usually a chemical interaction that is transduced as a change in one of the properties of the holographic reflection (as in the Bragg reflector), either refractive index or spacing between the holographic fringes. The specificity of the sensor can be controlled by adding molecules in the polymer film that selectively interacts with the molecules of interest.

A holographic sensor aims to integrate the sensor component, the transducer and the display in one device for fast reading of molecular concentrations based in colorful reflections or wavelengths.

Certain molecules that mimic biomolecule active sites or binding sites can be incorporated into the polymer that forms the holographic film in order to make the holographic sensors selective and/or sensitive to certain medical important molecules like glucose, etc.

The holographic sensors can be read from a fair distance because the transducer element is light that has been refracted and reflected by the holographic grating embedded in the sensor. Therefore, they can be used in industrial applications where non-contact with the sensor is required. Other applications for holographic sensors are anti-counterfeiting

== Metabolites ==
Some of the metabolites detected by a holographic sensor are:

- Ammonia
- pH
- Hydrocarbons

- VOCs
- Gases

- Glucose
- Water content
- Lactate and other biomolecules
- Metal ions
