= Pellistor =

A pellistor is a solid-state device used to detect gases which are either combustible or which have a significant difference in thermal conductivity to that of air. The word "pellistor" is a combination of pellet and resistor.

== Principle ==
The detecting element consists of small "pellets" of catalyst loaded ceramic whose resistance changes in the presence of gas. Many of them require gentle heating in use, so they are four terminal devices with two connections for a small heating element and two for the sensor itself.

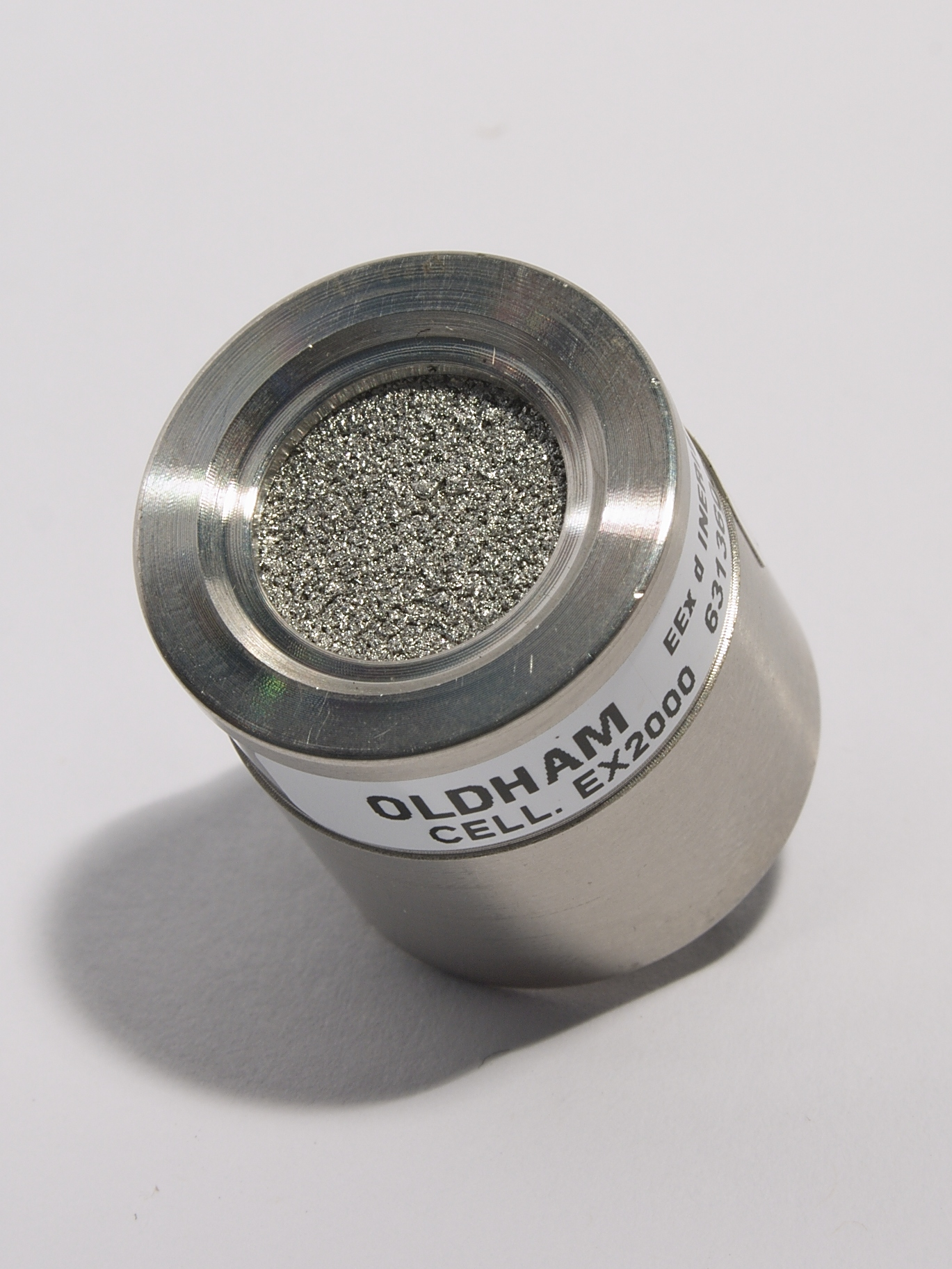
Robust sensor with stainless steel case and sintered port

To avoid any risk of explosion, the sensitive element is usually enclosed in a wire mesh housing. More robust sensors for use in high risk environments may have solid steel housing with a gas port of sintered metal granules. Both of these work in a manner similar to the Davy safety lamp; gas may percolate through the permeable mesh, but the passages are too long and narrow to support the propagation of a flame.

== History ==
The pellistor was developed in the early 1960s for use in mining operations as the successor of the flame safety lamp and the canary. It was invented by English scientist Alan Baker.

== Types ==
=== Catalytic ===
The catalytic pellistor as used in the catalytic bead sensor works by burning the target gas; the heat generated produces a change in the resistance of the detecting element of the sensor proportional to the gas concentration.

=== Thermal conductivity ===
The thermal conductivity (TC) pellistor works by measuring the change in heat loss (and hence temperature/resistance) of the detecting element in the presence of the target gas.

== See also ==
- List of portmanteaus
- List of sensors
