= Explosive gas leak detector =

An explosive gas leak detector is a device used to detect explosive gas leaks in enclosed spaces. Typically, a local alarm will be triggered, and optionally a remote alarm may also be connected.

Carbon monoxide detectors will not detect explosive mixtures; thus the device is often recommended to complement the CO detector. Combination explosive gas leak and carbon monoxide detectors exist.

A detector for propane is best placed down low near the floor, as propane is heavier than air. A detector for natural gas (city gas) is best placed up high, near the ceiling. Some detectors can detect both natural gas or propane, but this requires a compromise location.
