= Lower flammability limit =

The lower flammability limit (LFL), usually expressed in volume per cent, is the lower end of the concentration range over which a flammable mixture of gas or vapour in air can be ignited at a given temperature and pressure. The flammability range is delineated by the upper and lower flammability limits. Outside this range of air/vapor mixtures, the mixture cannot be ignited at that temperature and pressure. The LFL decreases with increasing temperature; thus, a mixture that is below its LFL at a given temperature may be ignitable if heated sufficiently.

For liquids, the LFL is typically close to the saturated vapor concentration at the flash point, however, due to differences in the liquid properties, the relationship of LFL to flash point (which is also dependent on the test apparatus) is not fixed and some spread in the data usually exists.

The $LFL_{mix}$ of a mixture can be evaluated using the Le Chatelier mixing rule if the $LFL_{i}$ of the components $i$ are known:

$LFL_{mix}=\frac{1}{\sum \frac{x_{i}}{LFL_{i}}}$

Where $LFL_{mix}$ is the lower flammability of the mixture, $LFL_{i}$ is the lower flammability of the $i$-th component of the mixture, and $x_{i}$ is the molar fraction of the $i$-th component of the mixture.

== See also ==
- Flash point
- Minimum ignition energy
- Stoichiometry
