= L11 =

L11 or L-11 may refer to:

== Vehicles ==
=== Aircraft ===
- Albatros L 11, a German biplane bomber
- Daimler L11, a German monoplane fighter
- Lucas L11, a French ultralight

=== Locomotives ===
- LSWR L11 class, a British steam locomotive

=== Ships ===
- USS L-11 (SS-51), a submarine of the United States Navy
- HMS L11, a submarine of the Royal Navy
- HMS Fernie (L11), a destroyer of the Royal Navy
- HMS Intrepid (L11), an amphibious warfare ships of the Royal Navy

== Weapons ==
- L-11 76.2 mm tank gun, a Soviet tank gun
- Blohm & Voss L 11, a German experimental anti-ship missile
- M2 Browning, a machine gun designated L11 by the British Army
- Royal Ordnance L11, a British tank gun
- L-11, the assembly number of the Little Boy atomic bomb dropped on Hiroshima

== Other uses ==
- 60S ribosomal protein L11
- Barcelona Metro line 11, a light metro line in Barcelona, Spain
- Mitochondrial ribosomal protein L11
- Nikon Coolpix L11, a digital camera
