= E4500 =

E4500 may refer to:

- A type of a digital camera from the Nikon Coolpix series
- A type of a processor from the Intel Core 2 series
