= S600 =

S600 can refer to:

- S600, a Canon S Series printer
- Nikon Coolpix S600, a digital camera
- Honda S600, a 1964–1966 automobile
- Mercedes-Benz S600, a car model
- S600, a Sendo mobile phone model
- Shorland S600, a 1995 armoured personnel carrier model
- Snapdragon 600, a quad-core mobile processor by Qualcomm
