= E7600 =

E7600 may refer to:

- Nikon Coolpix 7600, a digital camera
- Intel Core 2 Duo E7600 "Wolfdale-3M", a central processor
