= E4300 =

E4300 may refer to:

- Nikon Coolpix 4300, a digital camera by Nikon
- Intel Core 2 Duo E4300, a microprocessor
