= S2600 =

S2600 may refer to:

- a server model by NCR Corporation
- Coolpix S2600, a digital camera model by Nikon
