= L15 =

L15 or L-15 may refer to:

== Vehicles ==
Aircraft

- Boeing L-15 Scout, an American liaison aircraft
- Daimler L15, a German light aircraft
- Hongdu L-15, a Chinese supersonic training and light attack aircraft
- Zeppelin LZ 48, a German airship of World War I

Ships

- HMS Bulwark (L15), an amphibious assault ship of the Royal Navy
- HMS Eggesford (L15), a destroyer of the Royal Navy
- HMS Fowey (L15), a sloop of the Royal Navy
- HMS L15, a submarine of the Royal Navy
- INS Kesari (L15), several ships of the Indian Navy

== Other uses ==
- 60S ribosomal protein L15
- Lectionary 15, a 13th-century, Greek manuscript of the New Testament
- Lindeteves-Jacoberg Limited, a Singaporean investment holding company
- Mitochondrial ribosomal protein L15
- Nikon Coolpix L15, a digital camera
