= Nikon Coolpix 4600 =

Digital camera model

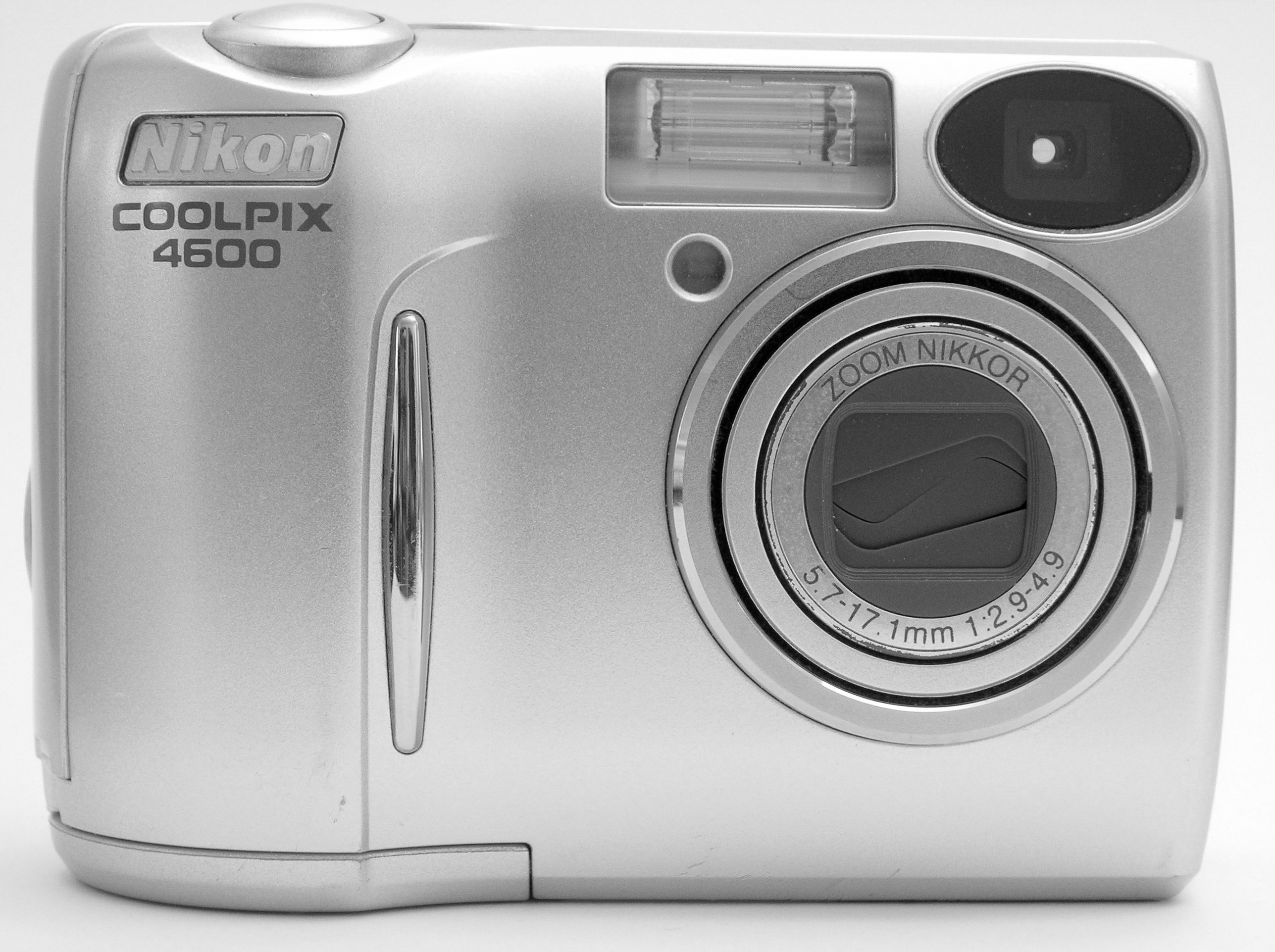
- The Nikon Coolpix 4600

Overview
- Maker: Nikon
- F-numbers: 2.9-4.9

Shutter
- Shutter speeds: 4 to 1/3000 seconds

General
- Dimensions: 83.8 x 61 x 35.6 mm (3.3 × 2.4 × 1.4 in)
- Weight: 130 g (4.6 oz)

The Nikon Coolpix 4600 digital camera, also known by its internal name E4600 is a member of the Nikon-produced Coolpix series. It has a resolution of 4.0 megapixels. The camera features its own internal memory, capable of storing 32MB of data. Additionally, it is compatible with a removable Secure Digital card of varying capacities. The storage space used is selectable, allowing the user to save pictures to either the internal or external memory by ejecting the card. The camera has an eight-function click-wheel that allows for the quick usage of many types of image presets, such a portraits, outdoor scenery, and night shooting. It can also record video clips of indefinite length, provided there is sufficient space remaining on the memory medium. The camera's lens has a focal length of 5.7-17.1 mm, an f-number of 2.9-4.9, giving a 3× magnification optical zoom. The digital zoom is 4×. It is powered by two AA batteries, and a USB Mini-A adapter for displaying the memory externally as well as for connecting the camera to a computer when there is no card reader present.
