= Nikon Coolpix S2500 =

Digital camera model

Overview
- Type: Compact digital camera

Sensor/medium
- Storage media: Approx. 16MB, SD/SDHC/SDXC memory cards

General
- Battery: Approx. 220 shots with EN-EL19 battery
- Dimensions: 93.1 mm × 57.1 mm × 20.0 mm
- Weight: Approx. 117 g (4.1 oz) (with battery and SD memory card)

Nikon Coolpix S2500 is a digital camera released by Nikon in February 2011. Its image sensor is a CCD with 12 million effective pixels and has 4 colors available: pink, red, silver and black.

== Scene Modes ==
The S2500 has 6 scene modes which can be selected on the back of the camera:

- Portrait: Useful for taking someone's face.
- Landscape: Useful for taking
- Night Portrait: Useful for taking portraits when the background is dark.
- Night Landscape: Similar to landscape, but more suitable when the background is dark.
- Close-up: Useful for taking detailed pictures.
- Backlighting: ?

== See also ==
- Nikon Coolpix series
