= Nikon Coolpix S3100 =

Digital camera model

Overview
- Type: Compact digital camera

Sensor/medium
- Maximum resolution: 14.48 million pixels (Approx.)
- Storage media: Approx. 45MB, SDHC/SDXC memory cards

Exposure/metering
- Exposure metering: Multi-segment, Centre-weighted, Spot

General
- LCD screen: Approx. 2.7" with anti-glare coating
- Battery: Approx. 220 shots with EN-EL19
- Dimensions: 93.5 mm × 57.5 mm × 18.4 mm
- Weight: Approx. 118 g (4.2 oz) (with battery and memory card)

Nikon Coolpix S3100 is a compact digital camera released by Nikon in February 2011. Its image sensor is a CCD with 14 million effective pixels and has seven colors available: black, blue, pink, purple, yellow, red and silver. S3100 has a slimmer body and more scene modes than its predecessor, S3000.

== Scene Modes ==
The S3100 has 19 scene modes which can be accessed on the back of the camera:

- Portrait: useful for photographing faces
- Landscape:
- Sports:
- Night portrait: useful for taking portraits when the background is dark
- Party/indoor:
- Beach:
- Snow:
- sunset:
- Dusk/dawn:
- Night Landscape:
- Close-up: useful for taking detailed images
- Food:
- Macro:
- Museum:
- Fireworks show:
- Black and White Copy:
- Backlighting:
- Panorama assist:
- Pet Portrait: When a dog or cat faces the camera, the camera automatically detects the face and then release the shutter, the shutter can change to manual by disabling the pet portrait auto release feature.

== See also ==
- Nikon Coolpix series
