= Nikon Coolpix L3 =

Digital camera model

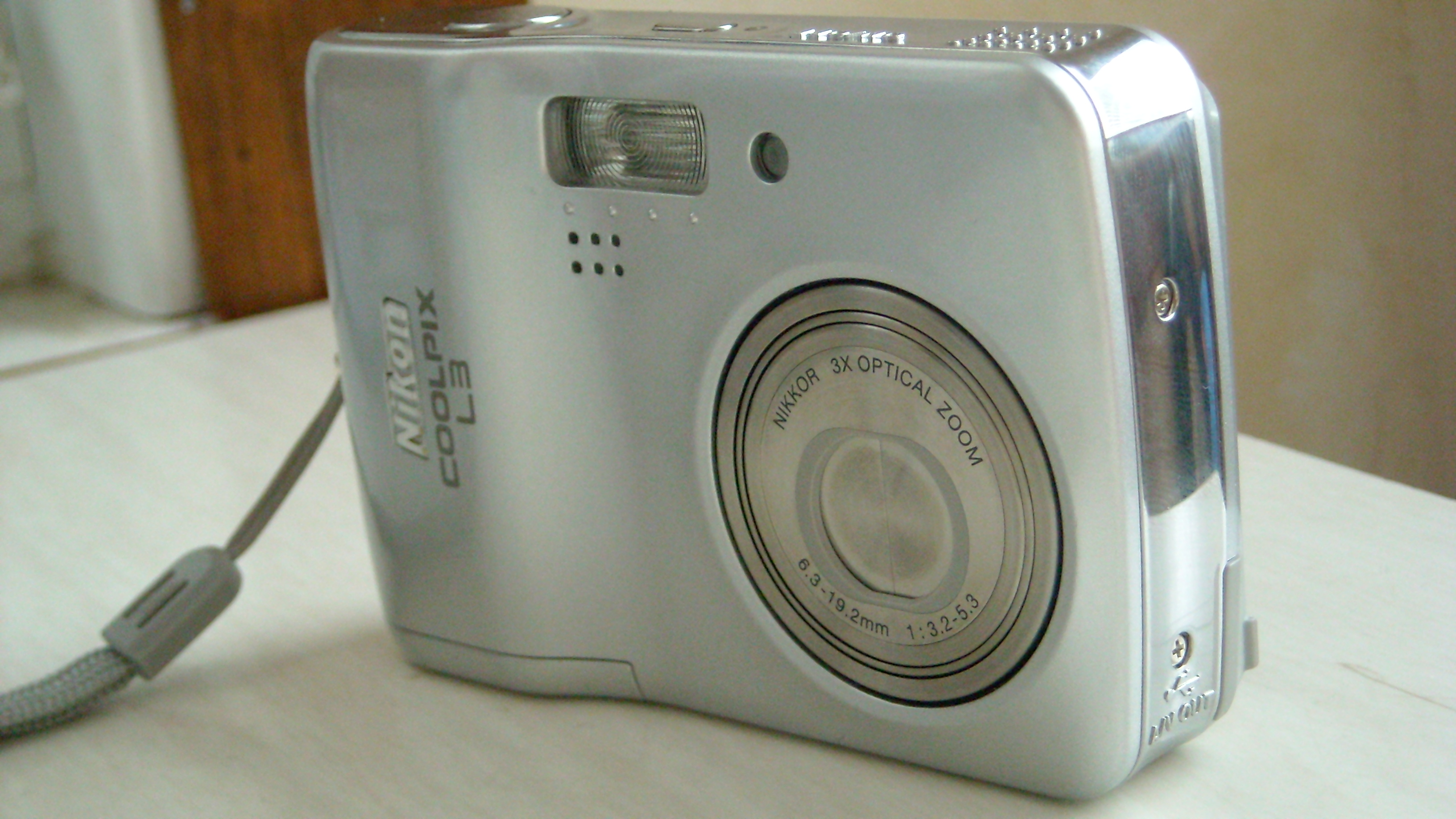

Overview
- Maker: Nikon
- Type: Point-and-shoot

Lens
- Lens: 3x Zoom-Nikkor; 6.3-19.2mm; f/3.2-5.3 (35 mm equivalent)

Sensor/medium
- Sensor: CCD
- Maximum resolution: 2,592 × 1,944 (5.00 million)
- Storage media: Internal (23 MB); SD/MMC card (optional)

Exposure/metering
- Exposure metering: 256 segment Matrix

Flash
- Flash: Built-in

Shutter
- Continuous shooting: 1.7 frame/s

Viewfinder
- Viewfinder: No

General
- LCD screen: 2.0", 86,000 pixel TFT
- Battery: 2 Nikon NiMH AA batteries
- Optional battery packs: 2 alkaline AA batteries 2 Li-ion AA batteries
- Weight: 170 g (6 oz) (inc. battery)

The Coolpix L3 is a discontinued compact point-and-shoot digital camera produced by Nikon. It was branded as part of the "Life" or "L-series" cameras in the Coolpix family. It had a 5.1 megapixel maximum resolution, 2" TFT LCD monitor, 3x Optical Zoom, D-Lighting, and Face-priority AF.
