= Nikon Coolpix P7800 =

Digital camera model

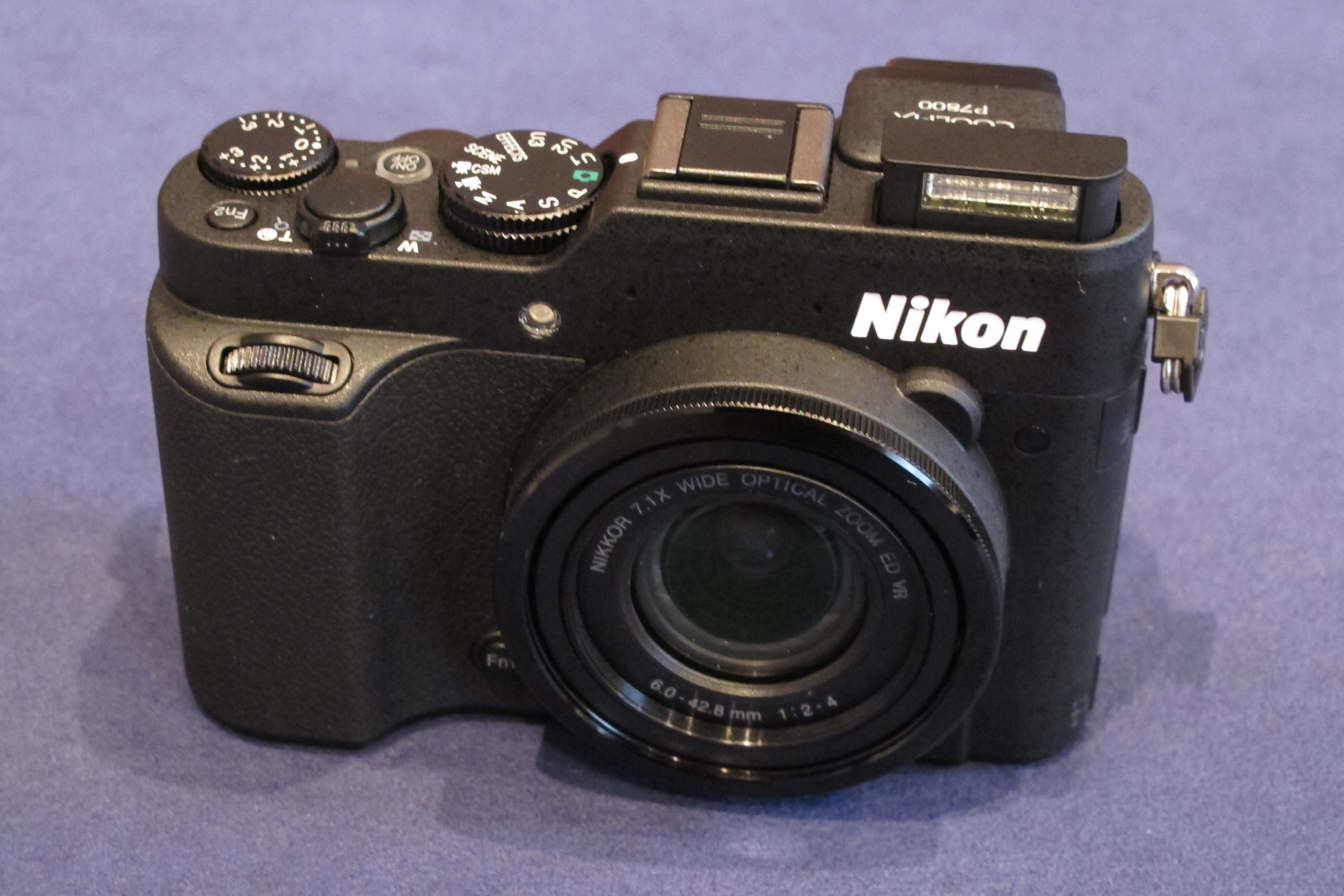

Overview
- Maker: Nikon

Lens
- Lens: 28-200mm equivalent
- F-numbers: f/2.0-f/4.0 at the widest

Sensor/medium
- Sensor type: BSI-CMOS
- Sensor size: 7.44 x 5.58mm (1/1.7 inch type)
- Maximum resolution: 4000 x 3000 (12 megapixels)
- Recording medium: SD, SDHC or SDXC memory card

Focusing
- Focus areas: 9 focus points

Exposure/metering
- Exposure modes: P, A, S, M

Shutter
- Shutter speeds: 1/4000s to 60s
- Continuous shooting: 8 frames per second

Viewfinder
- Frame coverage: 100%

Image processing
- White balance: Yes

General
- Video recording: 1920 x 1080p @ 30fps
- LCD screen: 3 inches with 921,000 dots
- Battery: Nikon EN-EL14 (a)
- Dimensions: 119 x 78 x 50mm (4.69 x 3.07 x 1.97 inches)
- Weight: 399 g (14 oz) including battery

The Nikon Coolpix P7800 is a digital compact camera announced by Nikon on September 5, 2013.

It bases on the Nikon Coolpix P7700, i.e. same lens system, flash socket and the same functionality regarding to the excellent operating modes and connectivity: mini-HDMI, USB-2, PAL/NTSC, remote sensor, external flash and for GPS-devices, among them Nikon GP1 and Dawn di-GPS line. The mini-HDMI connection can only be used in playback mode to display photos and videos from memory; the camera does not output realtime viewfinder video or audio over the mini-HDMI connector.

Additions and enhancements:

- the body has a bit more 'bumps' and 'bay windows' and some millimeters in depth and width as well as 7 grams more weight
- slight bigger grip
- changed positions of some of the function keys
- an Electronic viewfinder (-3 to +1 dioptric adjustment) and a rotating 3,0" TFT LCD Monitor (921,000 dots)
