= Handheld projector =

Image projector in a handheld device

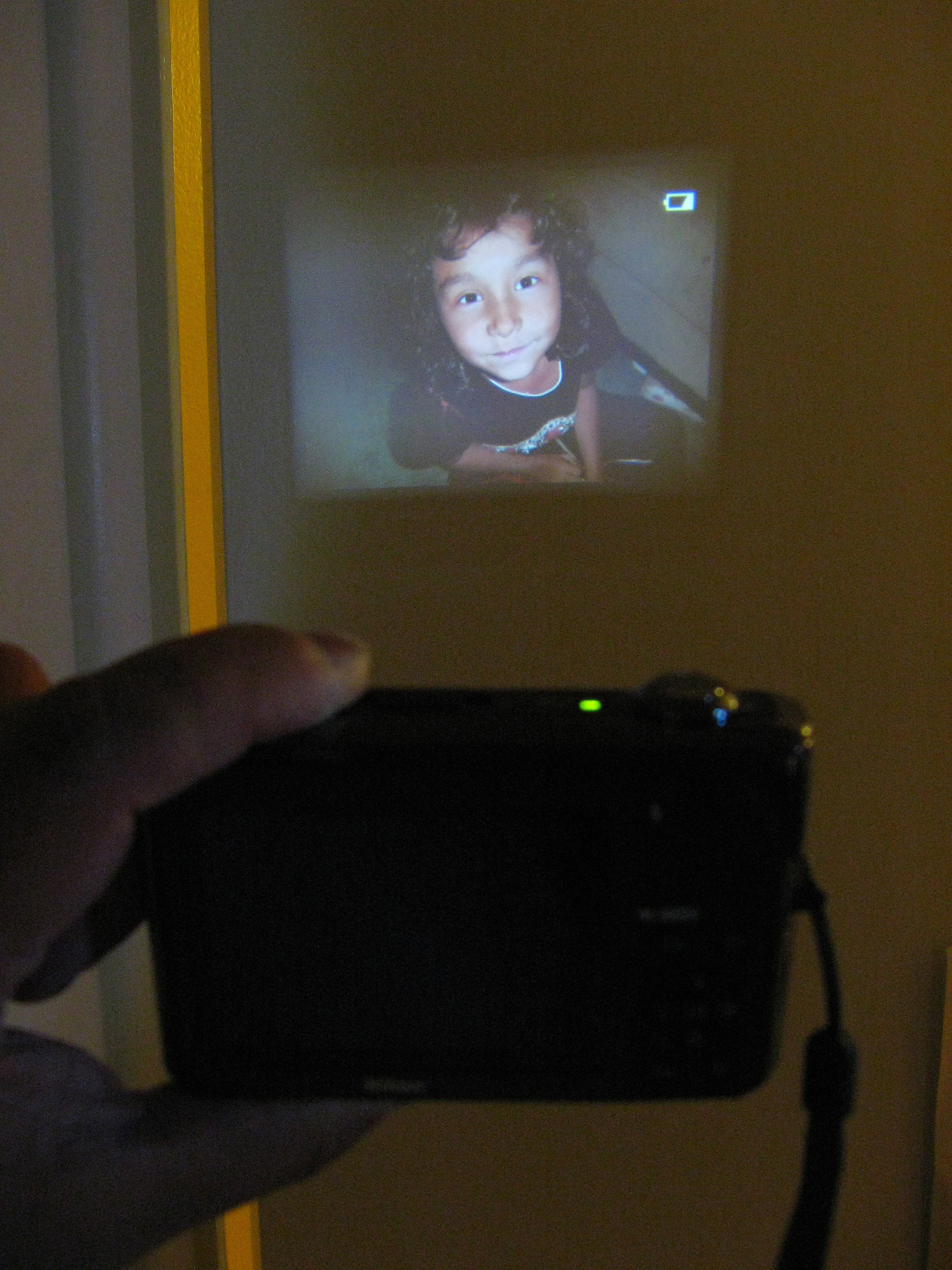
The Nikon Coolpix S1000pj compact camera projecting an image using its built-in projector.

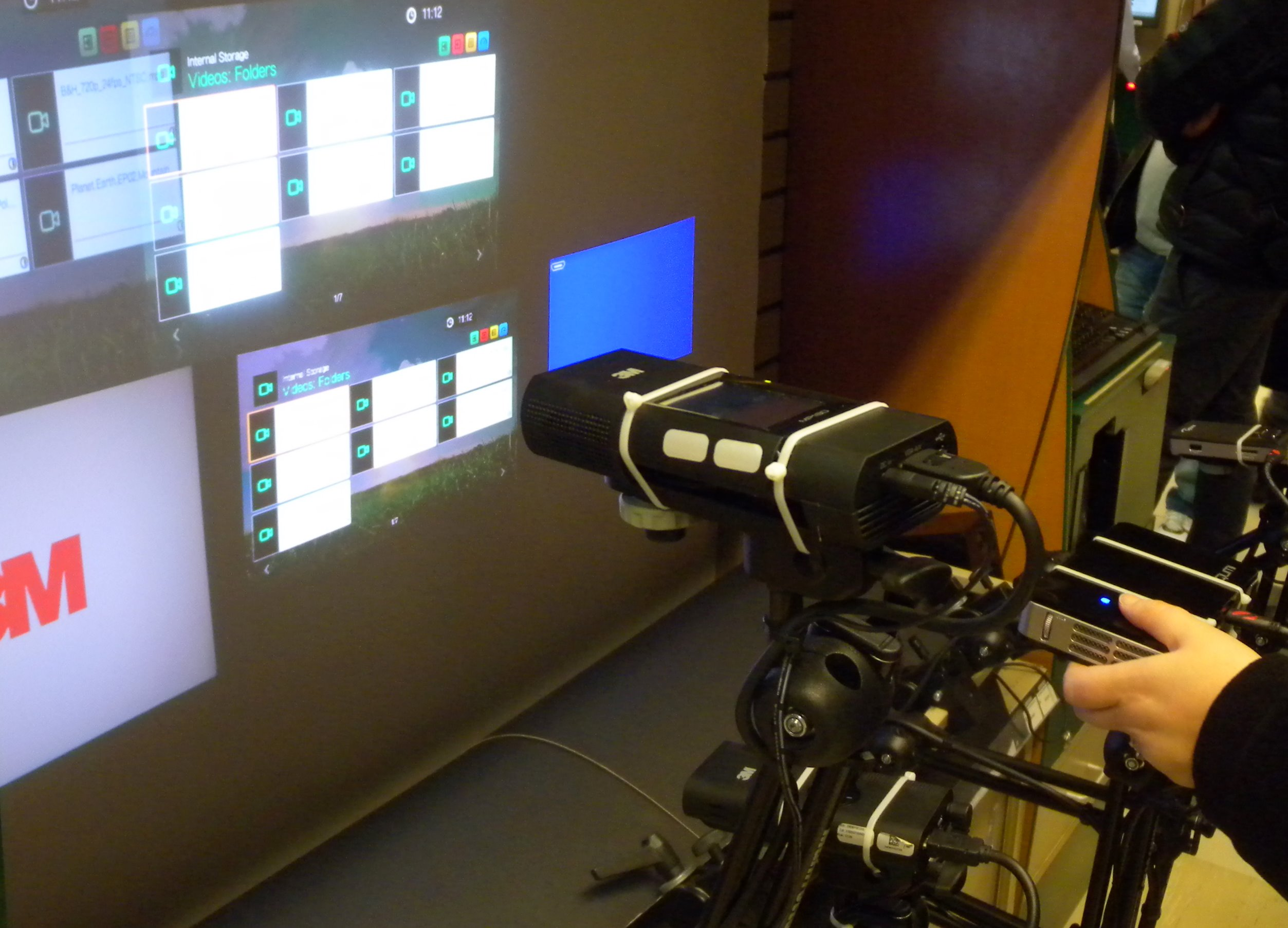
3M pocket projector

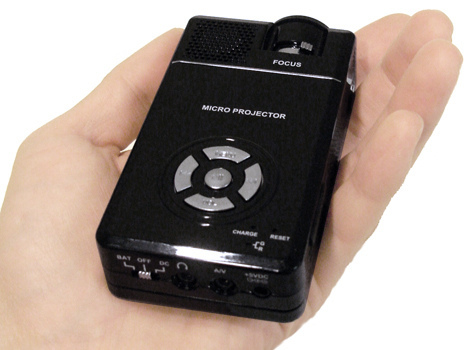
Handheld

A handheld projector (also known as a pocket projector, mobile projector, pico projector or mini beamer) is an image projector in a handheld device. It was developed as a computer display device for compact portable devices such as mobile phones, personal digital assistants, and digital cameras, which have sufficient storage capacity to handle presentation materials but are too small to accommodate a display screen that an audience can see easily. Handheld projectors involve miniaturized hardware, and software that can project digital images onto a nearby viewing surface.

The system comprises five main parts: the battery, the electronics, the laser or LED light sources, the combiner optic, and in some cases, scanning micromirror devices. First, the electronics system turns the image into an electronic signal. Next, the electronic signals drive laser or LED light sources with different colors and intensities down different paths. In the combiner optic, the different light paths are combined into one path, defining a palette of colors. An important design characteristic of a handheld projector is the ability to project a clear image on various viewing surfaces.

== History ==
Major advances in imaging technology have allowed the introduction of hand-held (pico) type video projectors. The concept was also introduced by Explay in 2003 to various consumer electronics players. Their solution was publicly announced through their relationship with Kopin in January 2005.

Insight Media market research has divided the leading players in this application into various categories:

- Micro-display makers (e.g., TI's DLP, Himax, Microvision, Lemoptix and bTendo MEMS scanners)
- Light source makers (e.g., Philips Lumileds, Osram, Cree LEDs and Corning, Nichia, Mitsubishi Lasers)
- Module makers (e.g., Texas Instruments (DLP), 3M Liquid crystal on silicon (LCoS))

Various manufacturers have produced handheld projectors exhibiting high-resolution, good brightness, and low energy consumption in a slightly larger format than pico since 2008. However, most handheld LED projectors, as of December 2017, have been widely criticized for having insufficient brightness for everyday use in a normally lit room.

In 2011, Texas Instruments DLP announced improved chipsets that enable brighter images, and LED advances were such that pico projectors using that technology were also increasing in brightness. The DLP chip sets are designed to enhance image brightness without increasing power usage for both WVGA (native DVD resolution) devices, such as mobile phones, and VGA devices, such as digital cameras and camcorders. The chip sets have the ability to project an image up to 50 inches (1,300 mm) (1270 mm) on any surface in optimum lighting conditions.

In 2014 Texas Instruments DLP's imagers occupied a significant portion of the handheld projector market share. In combination with Osram's Ostar series LEDs optical engines based on DLP technology have achieved over 15 lumens per watt for high brightness applications (300–500 lumens with 0.45" imager) and over 20 lumens per watt in low brightness applications (10–50 lumens with 0.2" or 0.3" imagers).

== Technologies ==
Three major image technologies for micro projectors are commonplace:

- Texas Instruments's Digital Light Processing (DLP)
- MicroVision, Inc.'s laser beam-steering (LBS)
- LCoS (Liquid crystal on silicon) manufacturers including Syndiant, Himax, Micron Technologies and Omnivision can usually supply companies with both LED and laser versions.

Most micro projectors employ one of these imagers, combined with color-sequential (RGB) LEDs in either a single or triple architecture format. Manufacturers that have adopted this technology include Digislide, Optoma's PK201 / PK301 (DLP), 3M's MPro 160 / 180 (LCoS), Aiptek's V50 (DLP), AAXA's M2 (LCoS), Bonitor MP302 (LCoS), Micron's PoP Video (LCoS), and Vivitek's High Definition Qumi (DLP). Some older models incorporated a single LCoS imager chip with single white LED for low cost, high resolution, and fast response at the expense of color quality. Other models such as the Dell M109S employed a color wheel plus white LED technology, which improves color quality but generally requires a larger form factor. Other micro projectors employ RGB laser technology, such as Microvision's beam-steering plus laser technology, and AAXA's laser plus LCoS technology.

Each method has advantages and disadvantages. For example, while DLP typically has slightly lower resolution than their LCoS counterparts due to the tiny mirrors used in DLP technology, 3-LED DLP projectors are generally regarded as having a higher contrast, better efficiency and lower power consumption as opposed color-sequential LCoS units and better color quality than white LED LCoS units. Laser scanning projectors such as Microvision's ShowX and AAXA's L1 offer very good color gamut and low power consumption due to the use of lasers as the light source and also present an image that is always in focus. However, high speckle noise along with thermal instability in the image remains a major challenge, primarily due to the pumped green laser. The new "Direct Green Laser" (DGL) technologies that replace the "pumped green laser" in next generation laser projectors, in combination with improved hardware optics, MEMS Mirror designs and other operational methods, are being deployed or are under development. Speckle noise should be reduced significantly, and thermal issues and power consumption greatly reduced.

== Applications ==
Handheld projectors can be used for different applications from small conventional projectors. Since 2008 researchers are studying applications that are specifically designed for handheld projectors often using prototypes of mobile phones with an integrated projector.

=== Mobile ===
21st century mobile phones have the ability to store thousands of photos and can take photos of good quality. Projector phones allow sharing them with a larger audience than on the phone's small screen. One study found that people preferred to view and share photos with projector phones, compared to using conventional mobile phones.

=== Gaming ===
Handheld projectors, in particular projector phones, could offer new possibilities for mobile gaming, as demonstrated by the adaptation of the PlayStation 3 game LittleBigPlanet. Players can sketch a world on a sheet of paper or use an existing physical configuration of objects and let the physics engine simulate physical procedures in this world to achieve game goals.

=== Hand gesture recognition ===
Size reduction of mobile devices is often limited by the size of the used display. Apart from the display a complete phone can be, for example, integrated in a headset. It has been demonstrated that pico projectors integrated in headsets could be used as interaction devices, e.g., using additional hand and finger tracking. The MIT Media Lab proposed a wearable gestural interface device named SixthSense. Chris Harrison developed a working system called Omnitouch. Finally, the Light Blue Optics Light Touch is yet another similar device. Lisa Cowan from UCSD showed a proof of concept of gesture recognition using shadow-occluding of the projector, called ShadowPuppets. A modified laser projector has been used to perform gesture recognition and finger tracking using laser-based active tracking techniques at the University of Tokyo (Smart Laser Scanner and Laser Sensing Display).

=== Pointer-based computer control ===
Combining a pico projector with a webcam, a laser pointer, and image processing software enables full control of any computing system via the laser pointer. Pointer on/off actions, motion patterns (e.g., dwell, repetitive visit, circles, etc.) and more can all be mapped to events which generate standard mouse or keyboard events, or user-programmable actions.

== Bibliography ==
- Brennesholtz, M (2008). "Market Segment Analysis: Pico-Projectors", Insight Media
