= Nikon Coolpix L20 =

Digital camera model

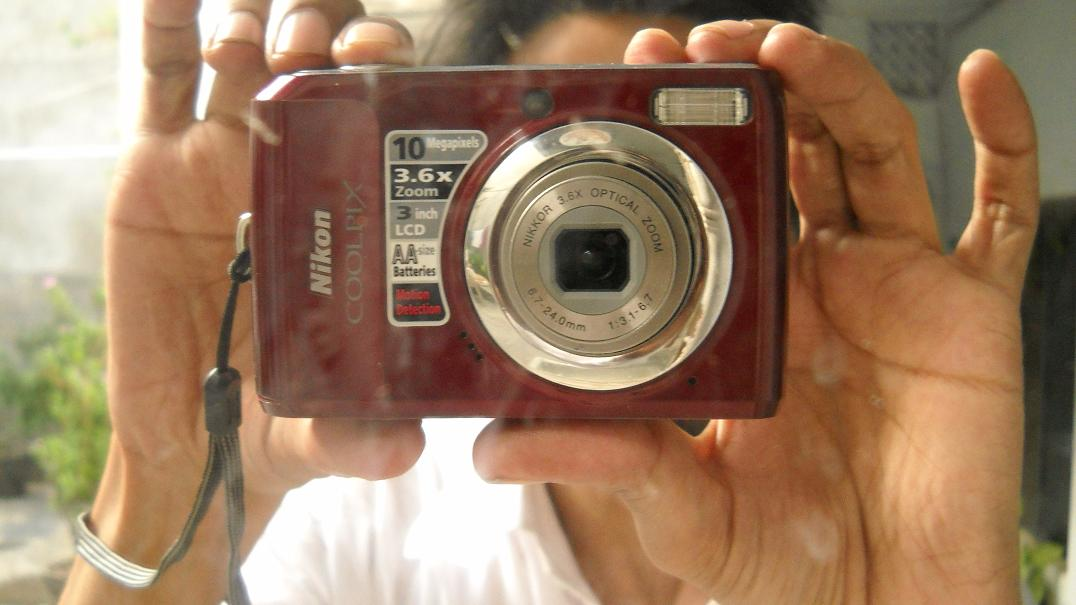

Overview
- Maker: Nikon
- Type: Point-and-shoot

Lens
- Lens: 3.6× Zoom-Nikkor; 6.7–24.0 mm (35 mm [135] format picture angle: 38–136 mm); f/3.1-6.7; Digital zoom: up to 4× (35 mm [135] format picture angle: 544 mm)

Sensor/medium
- Sensor: CCD
- Maximum resolution: 3,264 × 2,448 (10.00 million)
- Storage media: Internal (20 MB); SD/MMC card (optional)

Exposure/metering
- Exposure metering: 256-segment matrix

Flash
- Flash: Built-in

Viewfinder
- Viewfinder: No (no)

General
- LCD screen: 3.0", 230k-dot pixel TFT
- Battery: 2 alkaline AA batteries
- Optional battery packs: 2 Nikon NiMH AA batteries 2 Li-ion AA batteries
- Data port: USB 2.0 (480 Mbit/sec)
- Weight: 225 g (7.9 oz) (inc. battery)

The L20, announced by Nikon on April 1, 2009, is a rather small camera (even by compact standards), measuring 96.5 mm × 61 mm × 29 mm, it weighs almost 135 g (including batteries and memory card). Its sister model L19 is about 4 g lighter, because its LCD is comparatively smaller. Like all in the Nikon Coolpix series it has a shining plastic body.

It is available in Deep Red (most popular), Navy Blue, Black Metallic and Bright Silver, while its variant L19 is present as Magenta and Shiny Pink as an extra choice.

== Sample photographs ==
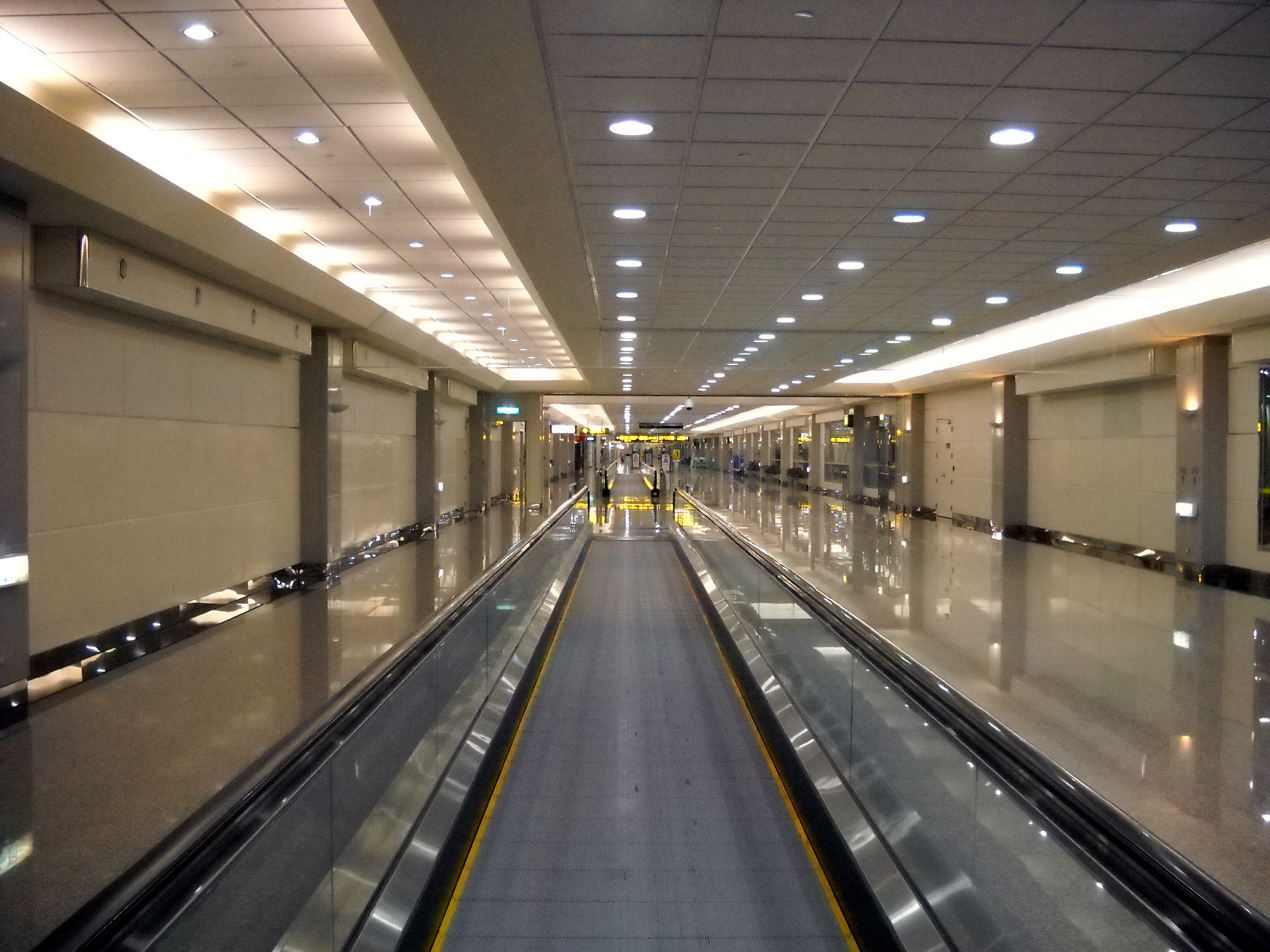

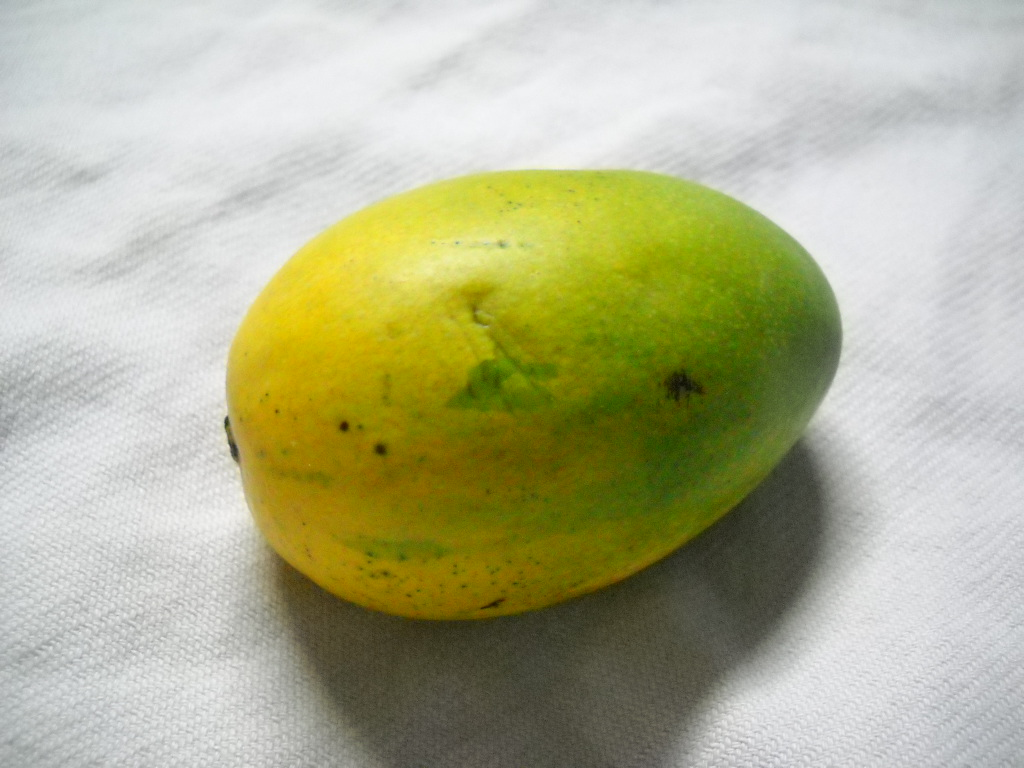

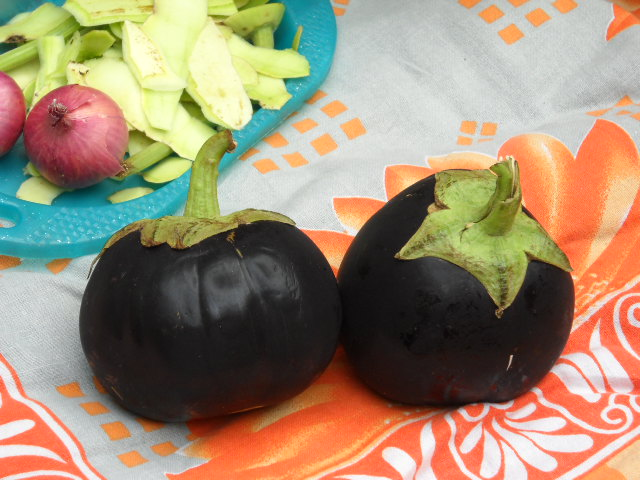

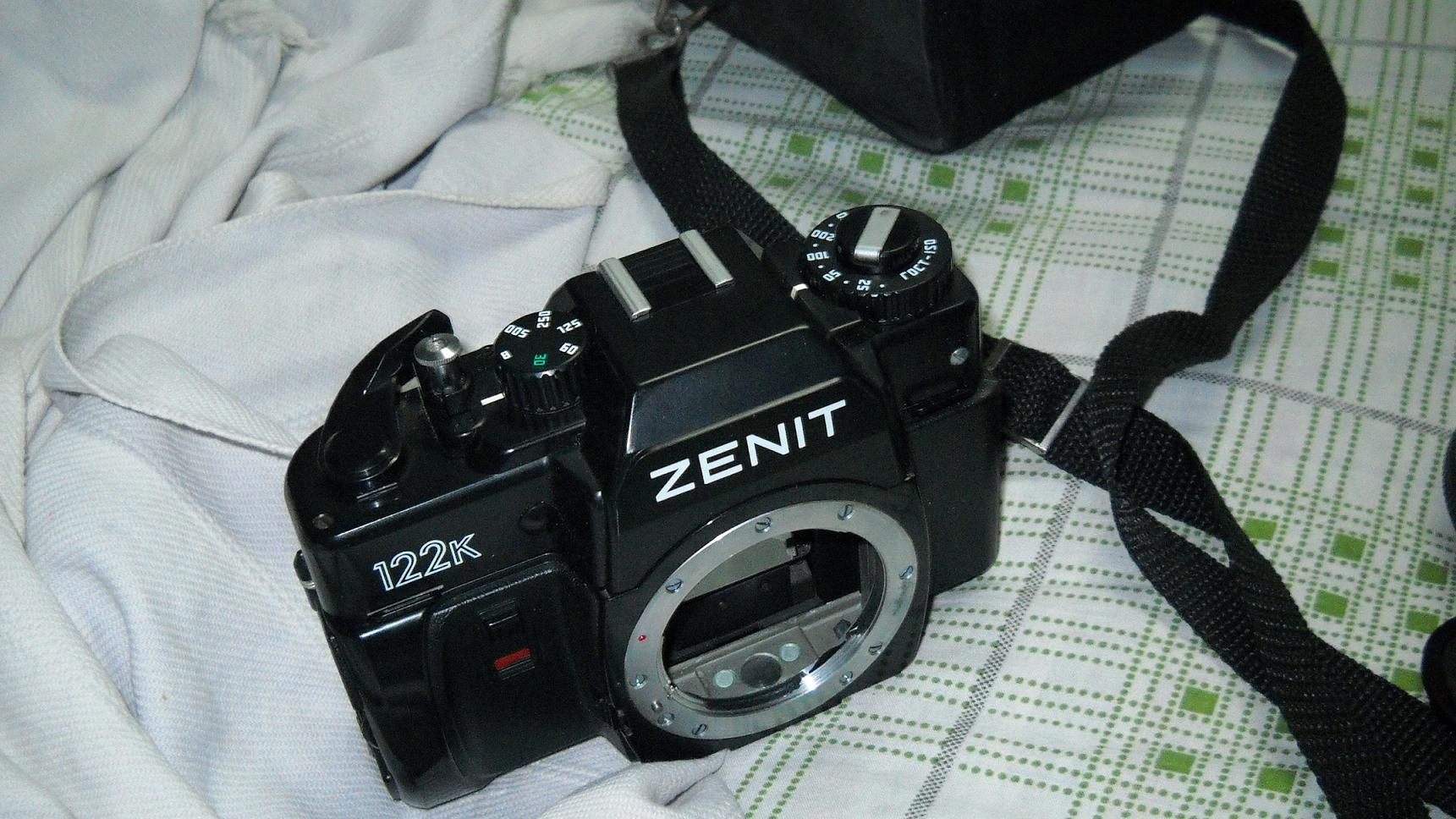

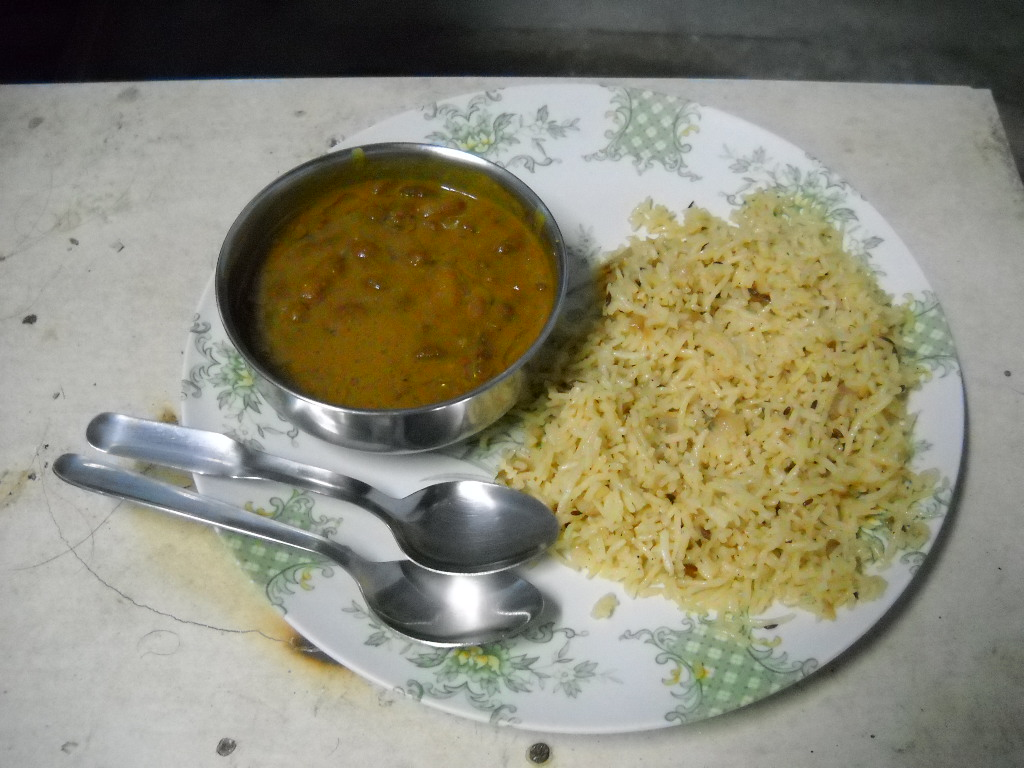
