= Nikon Coolpix S1000pj =

2009 digital compact camera

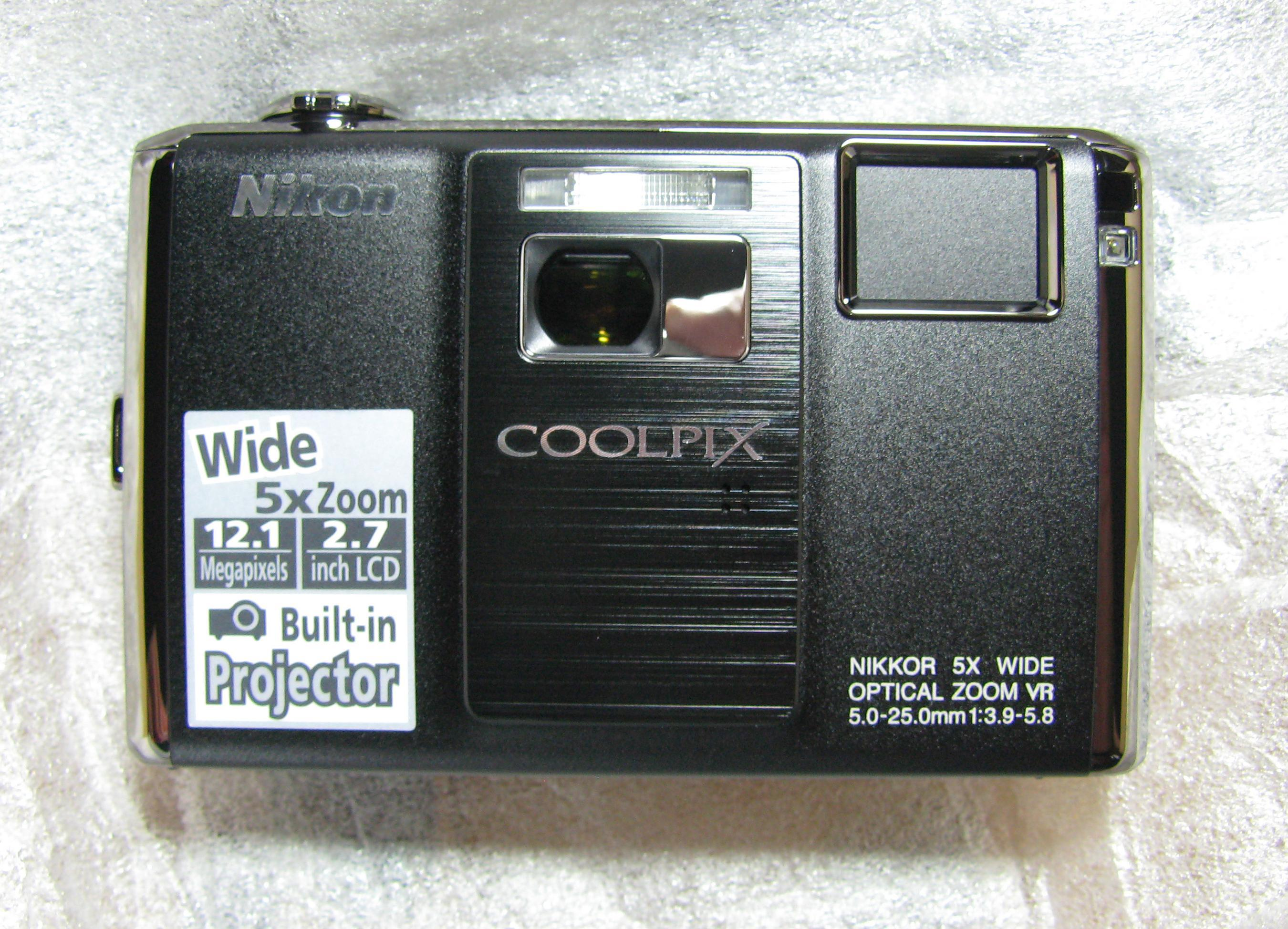

Overview
- Maker: Nikon
- Type: Point and shoot camera

Lens
- Lens: 5× Zoom, NIKKOR

Sensor/medium
- Sensor: 1/2.3 in. CCD
- Maximum resolution: 4000 × 3000 pixels (12.1 megapixels)
- Film speed: 80, 100, 200, 400, 800, 1600, (3200, 6400 at reduced resolution)
- Storage media: 36 MB internal memory SD/SDHC memory cards

Projector
- Brightness: up to 10 lumens
- Image size: 5 to 40 in.
- Throw distance: 0.26 to 2 m (10 in. to 6 ft 6 in.)

General
- LCD screen: 2.7-in., 230,000 dots, TFT LCD
- Battery: Lithium Ion EN-EL12
- Dimensions: 99.5 × 62.5 × 23 mm (4 × 2.5 × 0.9 in.)
- Weight: 155 g (5.5 oz)
- Made in: Indonesia

The Nikon Coolpix S1000pj is a compact digital camera manufactured by Nikon released in September 2009 as part of the Nikon Coolpix series. The S1000pj is the world's first compact camera to feature a built-in projector.

== Features ==
The Coolpix S1000pj is a 12.1 effective megapixels compact digital camera. The camera is capable of zooming 5x with a wide angle lens, has an ISO setting range from 80 to 6400 which can be selected automatically or adjusted manually, and a built in projector that can project an image of 5 inches (130 mm) to 40 inches (1,000 mm) in size and an approximate distance of 26 centimetres (10 in) to 2 metres (6 ft 7 in). The camera also features a 2.7 inch diagonal screen which is powered 230,000-dots of resolution with an anti-glare coating.

The camera weighs 5.5 ounces (160 g) and has a rechargeable battery life of 220 shots. When projecting continuously, the camera has a battery life of approximately one hour. A projector stand and remote are included with the purchase of the camera, which allow the use of the camera wirelessly.

The Coolpix S1000pj also incorporates Nikon's Smart Portrait System, which includes automatic built in red-eye correction, face priority autofocus (which allows automatic focusing on up to 12 faces), "blink warning and proof", in which users will be warned if the picture taken has subjects with their eyes closed, and a "smile timer," in which the camera waits until a face in the frame smiles to automatically take the picture.

== Accessories ==
The camera package includes a rechargeable Li-ion battery (EN-EL12), battery charger (MH-65), USB cable (UC-E6), audio video cable (EG-CP14), strap (AN-CP19), projector stand (ET-2), and remote control (ML-L4).

== See also ==
- Nikon Coolpix series
- Handheld projector
- LG eXpo
