= Nikon Coolpix S800c =

Digital camera model

Coolpix S800c
Overview
- Maker: Nikon

Lens
- Lens: 10× optical zoom, 4.5–45mm (135mm film equivalent to 25–250mm)
- F-numbers: f/3.2~5.8

Sensor/medium
- Sensor: 1/2.3-in.
- Sensor type: CMOS
- Maximum resolution: 4608 × 3456
- Film speed: ISO 125–1600 (3200 available as boost)
- Recording medium: SD/SDHC (4GB onboard storage)

General
- Video recording: H.264, up to 1920 × 1080/30p
- LCD screen: 3.5 in (89 mm), 819k-dot FWVGA (854×480) OLED with touchscreen
- Battery: EN-EL12 Li-ion
- AV port: HDMI
- Data port(s): USB, 802.11b/g/n
- Body features: Android 2.3.3 Gingerbread, built-in GPS
- Dimensions: 111.4 mm × 60.0 mm × 27.2 mm (4.39 in × 2.36 in × 1.07 in) (W × H × D)
- Weight: 184 g (6.5 oz) with battery and SD memory card

Chronology
- Successor: Nikon Coolpix S810c

The Nikon Coolpix S800c is the first digital compact camera with Android operating system announced Aug 22, 2012.

It's equipped with single-core ARM Cortex-A9 processor, 512MB of RAM, plus 4GB of built-in storage. Video output is accelerated with PowerVR SGX540 GPU.

== Features ==
Core camera features (sensor, lens) are shared with the Coolpix S6300.

- Android 2.3.3 OS
- 3.5" FWVGA (854×480) OLED touchscreen monitor
- GPS and Wi-Fi
- Email, web browsing, music streaming, social networking, Android apps
- CMOS sensor
- Lens-based and electronic Vibration Reduction
- 10x optical zoom
- 1080p video recording
- SD card storage with SDHC and SDXC support

== See also ==
- Nikon
- Nikon Coolpix series
- Samsung Galaxy Camera
