= Nikon Coolpix 5200 =

Digital camera model

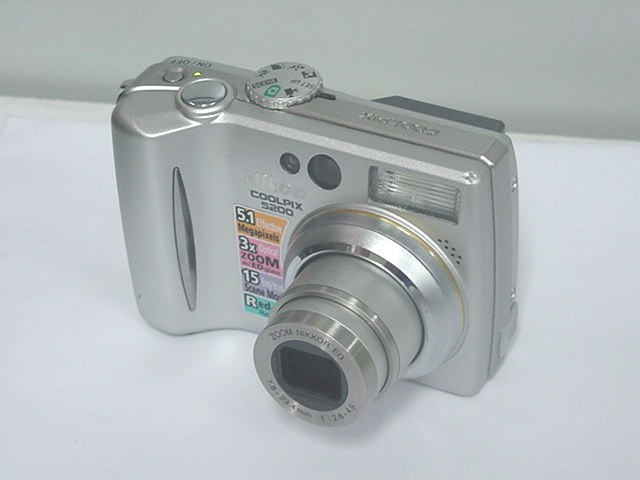
Nikon Coolpix 5200

The Nikon Coolpix 5200 was a digital camera manufactured and distributed by Nikon. It featured 5.1 megapixels, and a 3x optical/4x digital zoom. It was part of the Nikon Coolpix line of cameras Technology.

The Coolpix 5200 was announced in February 2004 alongside an otherwise identical 4 megapixel camera, the Coolpix 4200. Although the Coolpix 5200 echoed the basic design of the previous generation of Nikon Compacts (the 3200 and 4200), it was smaller due to its all-metal (aluminum) body. In addition to its smaller size, the 5200 advertised a 3x zoom lens, automatic red-eye removal, 15 scene modes, scene-assist functions, and a 30 frame per second movie mode.

== See also ==
- Nikon Coolpix series
- Nikon
