= Nikon Coolpix L15 =

Digital camera model

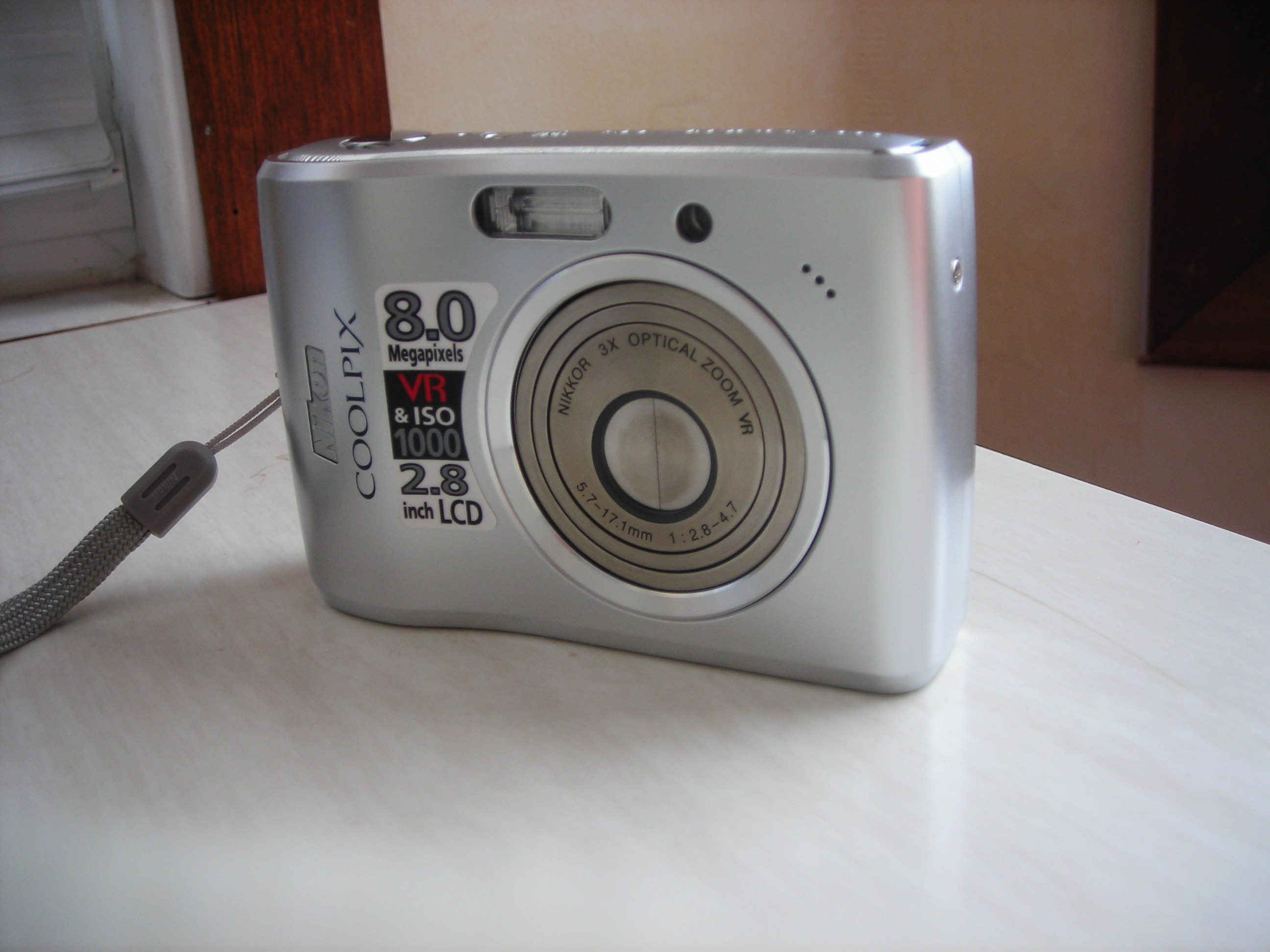

Overview
- Maker: Nikon
- Type: Point-and-shoot

Lens
- Lens: 3x Zoom-Nikkor; 5.7-17.1mm (35mm [135] format picture angle: 35-105mm); f/2.8-4.7

Sensor/medium
- Sensor: CCD
- Maximum resolution: 3,264 × 2,448 (8.00 million)
- Storage media: Internal (23 MB); SD/MMC card (optional)

Exposure/metering
- Exposure metering: 256 segment Matrix

Flash
- Flash: Built-in

Shutter
- Continuous shooting: Yes

Viewfinder
- Viewfinder: No

General
- LCD screen: 2.8", 86,000 pixel TFT
- Battery: 2 alkaline AA batteries
- Optional battery packs: 2 Nikon NiMH AA batteries 2 Li-ion AA batteries
- Weight: 225 g (7.9 oz) (inc. battery)

The Coolpix L15 is a compact point-and-shoot digital camera produced by Nikon. It is branded as part of the "Life" or "L-series" cameras in the Coolpix family. It has an 8.0 megapixel maximum resolution, 2.8" TFT LCD monitor, 3x Optical Zoom, D-Lighting, Vibration Reduction and Face-priority AF. It is no longer in production.
