= Nikon Coolpix L11 =

Digital camera model

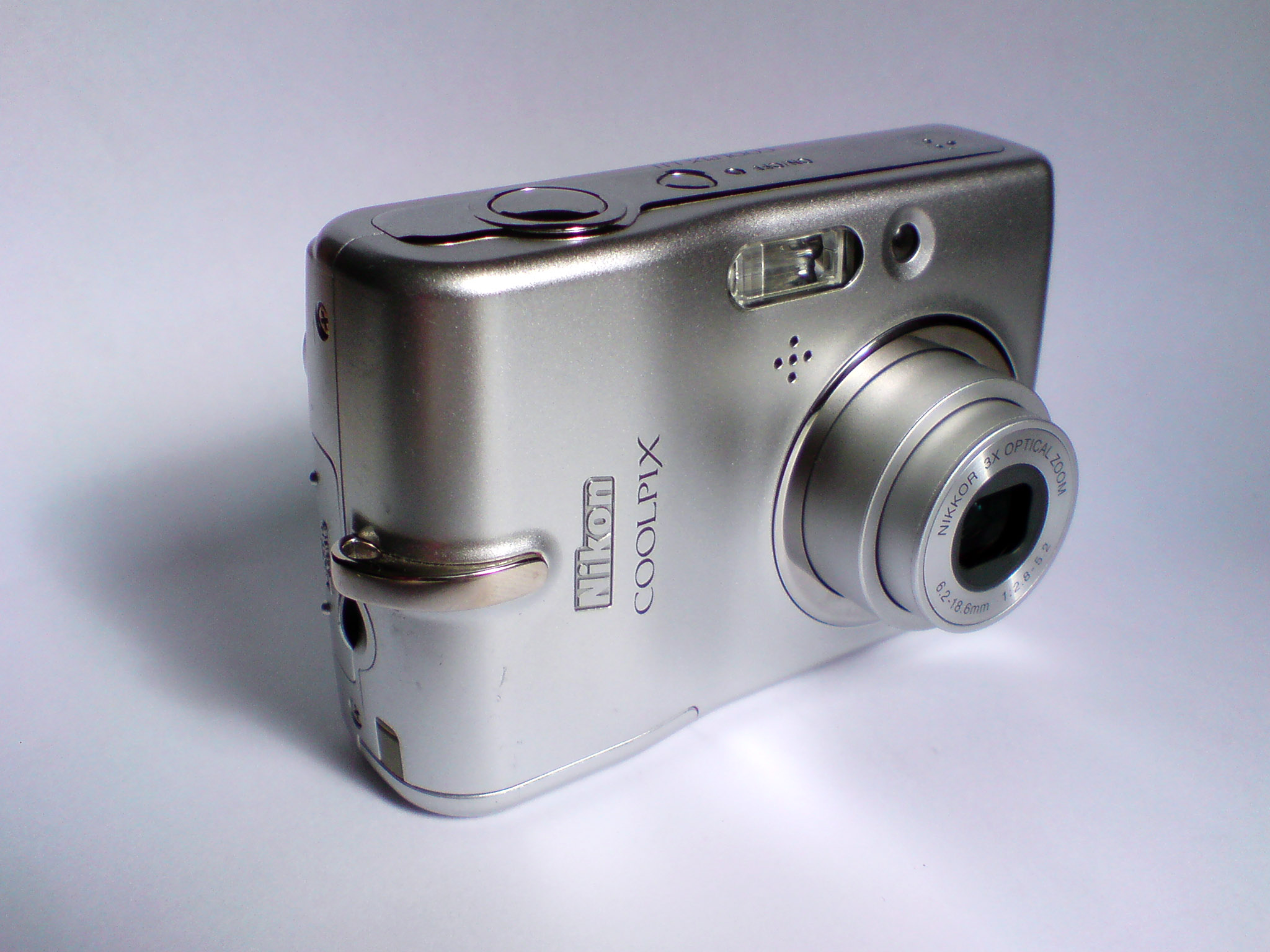

Overview
- Maker: Nikon Corporation
- Type: Compact digital camera; Point-and-shoot camera
- Released: February 2007

Lens
- Lens mount: Fixed Nikkor lens
- Lens: 6.2–18.6mm; 37.5–112.5mm (35mm equivalent)
- F-numbers: f/2.8–5.2

Sensor/medium
- Sensor size: 1/2.5" format; 5.76 × 4.29 mm; 4:3 aspect ratio
- Maximum resolution: 6.0 MP; 2816 × 2112 px
- Recording medium: 7 MB internal memory; SD card

Exposure/metering
- Exposure: Automatic

Flash
- Flash: Built-in

General
- Battery: 2 × 1.5V size-AA
- Dimensions: 89.5 × 60.5 × 27 mm
- Weight: 125 g (4 oz) (without batteries and memory card)

The Nikon Coolpix L11 is a compact automatic digital camera made by Nikon. It has a 6.0 megapixel maximum resolution, which can be adjusted, and an ISO up to 800 (cannot be adjusted). It features a QuickTime movie mode, many beginner scene modes, and a sound recorder. The camera uses 2 AA batteries for power.

The Best Shot Selector feature on this camera allows users to hold down the shutter button, and the camera will take ten pictures. Then, the camera will decide which one is the clearest and will save that one only. This is designed for use when taking a picture without flash in a dark setting.

== Other specifications ==
- Zoom: 3x optical, 4x digital
- Storage: 7 MB internal memory and SD memory cards
- File formats: JPEG for photos, MOV for video, WAV for sound recording
- Weight: 125g/4.4oz without battery and memory card
- Image resolution: 6 MP 2816x2112 (default), 3 MP 2048x1536, 1024x768, 640x480

== See also ==
- Nikon Coolpix series
- Nikon
