= Nikon Coolpix 4300 =

Digital camera model

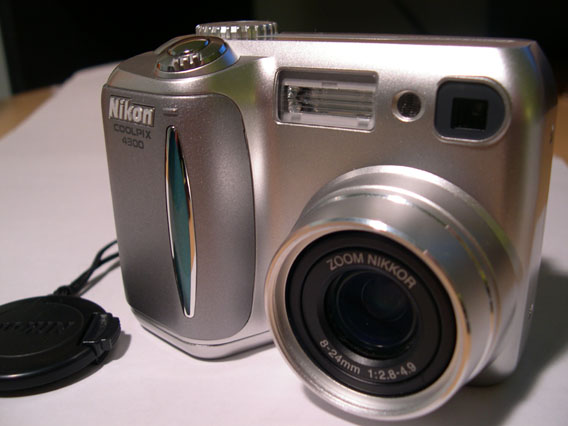
The Nikon Coolpix 4300

The Nikon Coolpix 4300 is a digital camera that was made by Nikon. It was first released on October 1, 2002, and is no longer in production. At 4.0 effective megapixels, it is capable of delivering 2,272 × 1,704 pixel images. An included lens cap protects its Nikkor 3× optical Zoom lens, with a focal length of 8 to 24 mm (equivalent of a field of view in 38 to 114 mm lens), as well as an aperture of f/2.8–4.9 and shutter speed of 8–1/1,000 sec. It is capable of ISO equivalents of 100, 200, and 400.

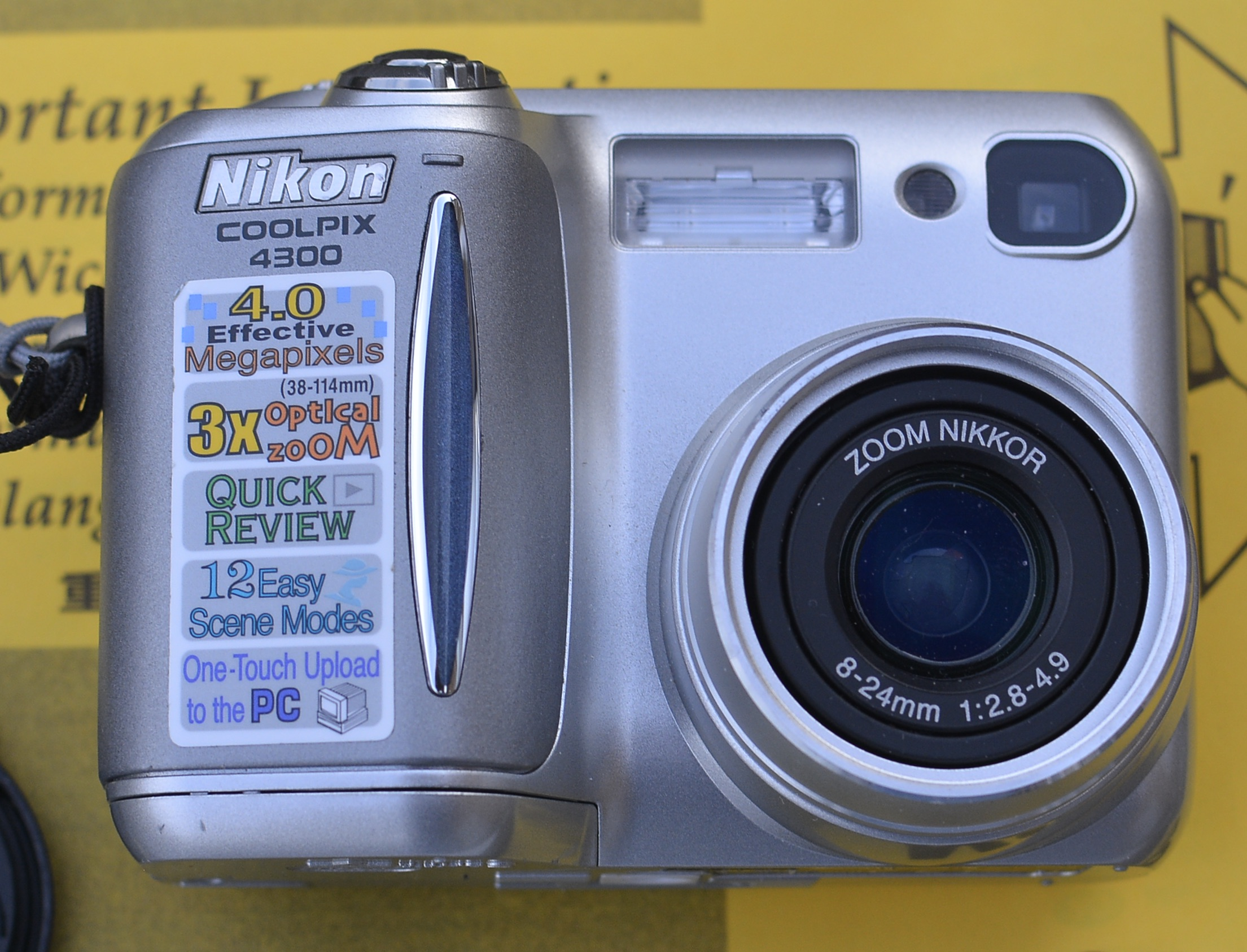
Nikon Coolpix 4300

Image viewing is done on its 1.5-inch TFT LCD screen, and Type 1 CompactFlash (CF) cards are its storage medium. It was designed to be powered by a rechargeable EN-EL1 lithium ion battery, but it also accepts the non-rechargeable 6 V 2CR5/DL245 lithium battery. It weighs about 7.9 ounces without the battery or CF card, and its components are housed inside a body sized at 3.7 in × 2.7 in × 2.0 in.

Twelve of Nikon's scene modes were built into the camera, as well as the ability to record 320 × 240 resolution, 15 fps silent video clips in the QuickTime .MOV file format.

This camera model was often criticized for its relatively short battery life. Moreover, it uses a non-standard battery type from an era where camera manufacturers liked to use proprietary shapes in order secure an after-market income. A further disadvantage is that the unit cannot be charged within the camera. To its credit, it uses CF cards and not one of the obsolete designs like MS, SM, or XD that severely restrict the use of competitive quality cameras of the time.

Advantages are a well above-average image quality regarding sharpness. Color rendition is accurate, especially regarding the critical leaf-green shades. It is, however, under-saturated, and often needs to be improved by subsequent processing. The camera has many setting options, but saturation is not one of them. It also has a zoom-linked optical viewfinder.
