= Nikon Coolpix =

Digital compact camera product line

The Nikon Coolpix series is a series of digital compact cameras in many variants produced by Nikon. It includes superzoom, bridge, travel-zoom, miniature compact and waterproof/rugged cameras.

== Current models ==
Nikon Coolpix cameras are organized into five different lines. The line in which a particular camera is placed is indicated by the letter which is the first character of its model number. The lines are: the (A) series, the (AW) all weather series, the (L) life series, the (P) performance series, and the (S) style series.

=== A Series ===
In 2013, Nikon introduced the Coolpix A Series, its latest flagship point and shoot camera.

| Model | Release date | Sensor res., size | Lens (35 mm equiv.) zoom, aperture | Screen size, pixels | Dimensions W × H × D (mm) | Weight | Image | Features | Ref. |
| Nikon Coolpix A | Mar 5, 2013 | 16 MP; 4928×3264; APS-C DX Sensor | 18,5 mm (28 mm equiv.) f/2.8 | 3.0 in 921,000 | 111 × 64.3 × 40.3 | 299 g (w/batt.) | | Flagship APS-C DX sized-sensor camera, 18.5 mm lens (28 mm equiv.), SD card storage, 1080p 30/25/24P video recording, WiFi Ready | |
| Nikon Coolpix A10 | January 14, 2016 | 16 MP; 4608×3456; 1/2.3" CCD Sensor | 26–130 mm (5x) f/3.2–6.5 | 2.7 in 230,000 | 96.4 × 59.4 × 28.9 | 160 g (w/batt and SD card.) | | | |

=== All Weather Series ===
| Model | Release date | Sensor res., size | Lens (35 mm equiv.) zoom, aperture | Screen size, pixels | Dimensions W × H × D (mm) | Weight | Image | Features | Ref. |
| AW100 | Aug 24, 2011 | 16 MP; 4608×3456; 1/2.3 in | 28–140 mm (5×) f/3.9–4.8 | 3.0 in 460,000 | 110.1 × 64.9 × 22.8 | 178 g (w/batt.) | | First ruggedised Coolpix, water resistant to 10 m, shock resistant from 1.5 m, cold resistant to -10 °C, backside illuminated CMOS sensor, electronic and lens-based Vibration Reduction, SD card storage, 1080p video recording, GPS geotagging | |
| AW100s | Aug 24, 2011 | 16 MP; 4608×3456; 1/2.3 in | 28–140 mm (5×) f/3.9–4.8 | 3.0 in 460,000 | 110.1 × 64.9 × 22.8 | 178 g (w/batt.) | | AW100 without GPS map capability | |
| AW110 | Feb 2013 | 16 MP1/2.3 in | 28–120 mm (5x) f/3.9-4.8 | 3.0 in OLED | 110.1 x 65.3 x 24.5 | 193 g | | Waterproof to 18 m, shock resistant to 2 m | |
| AW120 | Mar 2014 | 16 MP1/2.3 in | 24-120 (5x) f/2.8-4.9 | 3.0 in OLED | 110.1 x 66 x 25.5 | 213 g | | Waterproof to 18 m, shock resistant to 2 m | |
| AW130 | Mar 2015 | 16 MP1/2.3 in | 24-120 (5x) f/2.8-4.9 | 3.0 OLED 921,000 | 110.4 x 66 x 26.8 | 221 g | | Waterproof to 30m, shock resistant to 2.1 m | |

=== W Series ===
| Model | Release date | Sensor res., size | Lens (35 mm equiv.) zoom, aperture | Screen size, pixels | Dimensions W × H × D (mm) | Weight | Image | Features | Ref. |
| W300 | May 31, 2017 | 16 MP; 4608×3456; 1/2.3 in | 24–120 mm (5×) f/2.8–4.9 | 3.0 in 921,000 | 112 × 66 × 29 | 231 g (w/batt.) | | Water resistant to 30 m, shock resistant from 2.4 m, cold resistant to -10 °C, backside illuminated CMOS sensor, Vibration Reduction, SD card storage, 4K video recording, Compass, Barometer, GPS geotagging | |

=== B Series ===
| Model | Release date | Sensor res., size | ISO | RAW | GPS | Lens (35 mm equiv.) zoom, aperture | Screen size, pixels | Dimensions W × H × D (mm) | Weight | Image | Features | Ref. |
| B500 | Feb 23, 2016 | 16 MP; 4608×3456; 1/2.3 in | 125–6400 | No | No | 22.5–900 mm (40×) f/3.0–6.5 | 3.0 in 921,000 | 113.5 × 78.3 × 94.9 | 542 g (w/battery.) | | no RAW (only JPEG), Wi-Fi, Bluetooth, Near Field Communication, SD card storage, 1080p (1920×1080) 30/25P 60/50i video recording, CMOS sensor, AA batteries (Nikon battery EN-MH2 also available), ISO 6400 (high sensitivity) | |
| B700 | Feb 23, 2016 | 20.2 MP; 5184×3888; 1/2.3 in | 100–3200 | Yes | No | 24–1440 mm (60×) f/3.3–6.5 | 3.0 in 921,000 | 125 × 85 × 106.5 | 570 g (w/battery.) | | RAW, Wi-Fi, Bluetooth, Near Field Communication, SD card storage, 4K UHD (3840×2160) 30/25P video recording, CMOS sensor | |

=== Life Series ===
| Model | Release date | Sensor res., size | Lens (35 mm equiv.) zoom, aperture | Screen size, pixels | Dimensions W × H × D (mm) | Weight | Image | Features | Ref. |
| L25 | Feb 1, 2012 | 10.1 MP; 3648×2736; 1/3 in | 28–140 mm (5×) f/2.7–6.8 | 3 in 230 kpixel | 96.2 × 60.4 × 29.2 | 171 g (w/battery.) | | Uses 2 AA batteries, CCD sensor, electronic Vibration Reduction, SD card storage | |
| L26 | Feb 1, 2012 | 16.1 MP; 4608×3456; 1/2.3 in | 26–130 mm (5×) f/3.2–6.5 | 3 in 230 kpixel | 96.0 × 59.7 × 28.8 | 164 g (w/battery.) | | Uses 2 AA batteries, CCD sensor, electronic Vibration Reduction, SD card storage | |
| L27 | Jan 28, 2013 | 16.1 MP; 4608×3456; 1/2.3 in | 26–130 mm (5×) f/3.2–6.5 | 3 in 230 kpixel | 96.0 × 59.7 × 28.8 | | | Uses 2 AA batteries, CCD sensor, electronic Vibration Reduction, SD card storage | |
| L28 | Jan 28, 2013 | 20.1 MP; 5152×3864; 1/2.3 in | 26–130 mm (5×) f/3.2–6.5 | 3 in 230 kpixel | 96.0 × 59.7 × 28.8 | 169 g (w/battery.) | | Uses 2 AA batteries, CCD sensor, electronic Vibration Reduction, SD card storage | |
| L29 | Jan 7, 2014 | 16.1MP | 26-130mm (5×) | 2.7 in 230 kpixel | 96.0 × 59.7 × 28.8 | 164 g (w/battery.) | | Uses 2 AA batteries, CCD Sensor, SD Card storage | |
| L30 | Jan 7, 2014 | 20.1MP | 26-130mm (5×) | 3 in 230 kpixel | 96.0 × 59.7 × 28.8 | 164 g (w/battery.) | | Uses 2 AA batteries, CCD Sensor, SD Card storage | |
| L31 | Jan 14, 2015 | 16.1MP | 26-130mm (5×) | 2.7 in 230 kpixel | 96.0 x 59.7 x 28.8 | 160 g (w/battery.) | | Uses 2 AA batteries, CCD Sensor, SD Card storage | |
| L32 | Jan 14, 2015 | 20.1MP | 26-130mm (5×) | 3 in 230 kpixel | 96.0 x 59.7 x 28.8 | 164 g (w/battery.) | | Uses 2 AA batteries, CCD Sensor, SD Card storage | |
| L310 | | 14.1 MP; 4320×3240; 1/2.3 in | 25–525 mm (21×) f/3.1–5.8 | 3 in 230 kpixel | 109.9 × 76.5 × 78.4 | 435 g (w/battery.) | | Uses 4 AA batteries, CCD sensor, sensor shift and electronic Vibration Reduction, SD card storage | |
| L610 | Aug 9, 2012 | 16.0 MP; 4608×3456; 1/2.3 in | 25–350 mm (14×) f/3.1–5.8 | 3 in 460 kpixel | 108.0 × 68.4 × 34.1 | 240 g (w/battery.) | | Uses 2 AA batteries, CMOS sensor, lens shift Vibration Reduction, SD card storage | |
| L620 | | 18.1 MP; 4896×3672; 1/2.3 in | 25–350 mm (14×) f/3.3–5.9 | 3 in 460 kpixel | 197.3 x 68.7 x 34.1 | 237 g (w/battery.) | | Uses 2 AA batteries, CCD sensor, lens shift Vibration Reduction, SD card storage | |
| L810 | Feb 1, 2012 | 16.1 MP; 4608×3456; 1/2.3 in | 22.5–585 mm (26×) f/3.1–5.9 | 3 in 921 kpixel | 111.1 × 76.3 × 83.1 | 430 g (w/battery.) | | Uses 4 AA batteries, CCD sensor, lens shift Vibration Reduction, SD card storage | |
| L820 | Jan 28, 2013 | 16.1 MP; 4608×3456; 1/2.3 in | 22.5–675 mm (30×) f/3.0–o5.8 | 3 in 921 kpixel | 111.0 × 76.3 × 84.5 | 470 g (w/battery.) | | Uses 4 AA batteries, CMOS sensor, lens shift Vibration Reduction, SD card storage | |
| L840 | Feb 10, 2015 | 16 MP; 4608×3456; 1/2.3 in | 22.5–855 mm (38×) f/3.0–6.5 | 3 in 921 kpixel | 113.5 × 78.3 × 96.0 | 538 g (w/battery.) | | Uses 4 AA batteries, CMOS sensor, lens shift Vibration Reduction, SD card storage | |

=== Performance Series ===
| Model | Release date | Sensor res., size | Lens (35 mm equiv.) zoom, aperture | Screen size, pixels | Dimensions W × H × D (mm) | Weight | Image | Features | Ref. |
| P310 | Feb 1, 2012 | 16.1 MP; 4608×3456; 1/2.3 in | 24–100 mm (4.2×) f/1.8–4.9 | 3 in, 920 k pixel | 103.0 × 58.3 × 32.0 | 194 g (With battery and SD card) | | Compact 4.2× zoom camera, 16 MP CMOS sensor, lens-shift vibration reduction, 1080p video recording with stereo sound. SD/SDHC/SDXC support, Li-ion battery | |
| P510 | Feb 1, 2012 | 16.1 MP; 4608×3456; 1/2.3 in | 24–1000 mm (42×) f/3.5–5.9 | 3 in, 920 k pixel Tilting screen | 119.8 × 82.9 × 102.2 | 555 g (With battery and SD card) | | 42× superzoom camera, 16.1 MP CMOS sensor, Built in GPS, 4 focus modes, Tilting LCD screen, lens shift vibration reduction, 1080p video recording with stereo sound, VGA 640×480, SD/SDHC/SDXC support, Eye-Fi capable, Li-ion battery | |
| P520 | Jan 29, 2013 | 18 MP; 4896×3672; 1/2.3 in | 24–1000 mm (42×) f/3-5.9 | 3.2 in, approx. 921 k pixel, Articulating screen | 125.2 × 84.1 × 101.6 | 550 g w/ battery and SD memory card | | 42× superzoom camera, 18.1 MP backside-illuminated CMOS sensor, Built in GPS, Fully Articulated LCD screen, Active vibration compensation, 1080i 60/50 video w/ stereo audio, Hi-2 ISO (12800), Target-find AF, 7 FPS burst shooting, COOLPIX Picture Control, SD/SDHC/SDXC support, Li-ion battery, 3 available body colors | |
| P530 | | 16.1 MP; 4608×3456; 1/2.3 in | 24–1000 mm (42×) f/3-5.9 | 3 in, approx. 921 k pixel | 122.8 × 84.1 × 98.2 | 494 g w/ battery and SD memory card | | 42× superzoom camera, 16.1 MP CMOS sensor | |
| P610 | Feb 10, 2013 | 16 MP; 4608×3456; 1/2.3 in | 24–1440 mm (60×) f/3.3-6.5 | 3.0 in, Vari-Angle TFT-LCD with Anti-reflection coating | 125.0 × 85.0 × 106.5 | 565 g w/ battery and SD memory card | | 60x superzoom camera | |
| P900 | Mar 2, 2015 | 16.0 MP; 4608×3456; 1/2.3 in | 24–2000 mm (83×) f/2.8-6.5 | 3 in. approx. 921 k pixel | 139.5 x 103.2 x 157.4 (5.5 x 4.1 x 5.5 in) | 899 g. w/battery and memory card | | no RAW (only JPEG), GPS, 83x Superzoom up to digital 8000 mm, ISO 100 - 1600 (3200 - 6400 when using P, S, A, or M), CMOS sensor | |
| P950 | Jan 7, 2020 | 16.0 MP; 4608×3456; 1/2.3 in | 24–2000 mm (83×) f/2.8-6.5 | 3 in. approx. 921 k pixel | 140.2 x 109.6 x 149.8 mm (5.6 x 4.4 x 5.9 in.) | 1005 g. w/battery and memory card | | RAW (NRW) support, 83x Superzoom up to digital 4000 mm, ISO 100 - 1600 (3200 - 6400 when using P, S, A, M, U or Movie manual mode), CMOS sensor | |
| P1000 | Sep 6, 2018 | 16.0 MP; 4608×3456; 1/2.3 in | 24–3000 mm (125×) f/2.8-8 | 3.2 in. approx. 921 k pixel | 146.3 × 118.8 × 181.3 (5.8 × 4.7 × 7.2 in) | 1410 g. w/battery and memory card | | RAW (NRW) support, 125x Superzoom up to digital 12000 mm, ISO 100 - 1600 (3200 - 6400 when using P, S, A, or M), CMOS sensor | |
| P1100 | Feb 27, 2025 | 16.0 MP; 4608×3456; 1/2.3 in | 24–3000 mm (125×) f/2.8–8 | 3.2 in. approx. 921 k pixel (fully articulating) | 146 × 119 × 181 mm (5.7 × 4.7 × 7.1 in) | 1410 g. w/battery and memory card | | RAW (NRW) support, 125x Superzoom up to digital 12000 mm, ISO 100–6400, 4K UHD video, Wi-Fi/Bluetooth, Dual Detect Optical VR, BSI-CMOS sensor | |
| P7700 | Aug 22, 2012 | 12.2 MP; 4000×3000; 1/1.7 in | 28–200 mm (7.1×) f/2–4 | 3 in, 920 k pixel Tilting screen | 118 × 72 × 50 | 392 g (With battery and SD card) | | Compact 7.1× zoom camera, 12.2 MP CMOS sensor, Tilting LCD screen, 1080p video recording with stereo sound, lens-shift vibration reduction, SD/SDHC/SDXC support, Li-ion battery, NRW (RAW) image support. | |
| P7800 | Sep 2013 | 12.2 MP; 4000×3000; 1/1.7 in | 28–200 mm (7.1×) f/2–4 | 3 in, 920 k pixel Tilting screen; 0.5" viewfinder (EVF) | 118.5 × 77.5 × 50.4 | 399 g (With battery and SD card) | | Compact 7.1× zoom camera, 12.2 MP CMOS sensor, Tilting LCD screen, viewfinder (EVF), 1080p video recording with stereo sound, lens-shift vibration reduction, SD/SDHC/SDXC support, Li-ion battery, NRW (RAW) image support. | |

=== Style Series ===
| Model | Release date | Sensor res., size | Lens (35 mm equiv.) zoom, aperture | Screen size, pixels | Dimensions W × H × D (mm) | Weight | Image | Features | Ref. |
| S01 | Aug 22, 2012 | 10.1 MP; 3648×2736; 1/2.9 in | 29–87 mm (3×) f/3.3–5.9 | 2.5 in 230 kpixel | 77 × 51.2 × 17.2 | 96 g (w/batt.) | | CCD sensor, 2.5 in touch screen, 720p HD video recording, electronic Vibration Reduction, 7.3 GB internal memory | |
| S30 | Feb 1, 2012 | 10.1 MP; 3648×2736; 1/3 in | 29.1–87.3 mm (3×) f/3.3-5.9 | 2.7 in 230 kpixel | 101.9 × 64.8 × 39.4 | 214 g (w/batt.) | | Compact drop-resistant and waterproof with large buttons and simple interface (designed for kids) | |
| S800c | Aug 22, 2012 | 16.0 MP; 4608×3456; 1/2.3 in | 25–250 mm (10×) f/3.2–5.8 | 3.5 in 819 kpixel | 111.4 × 60.0 × 27.2 | 184 g (w/batt.) | | Android 2.3 OS, 3.5 in OLED touchscreen monitor, GPS, Wi-Fi, email, web browsing, music streaming, social networking, Android apps, CMOS sensor, lens-based and electronic Vibration Reduction, 1080p video recording, SD card storage with SDHC and SDXC support | |
| S1200pj | Aug 24, 2011 | 14.1 MP; 4320×3240; 1/2.3 in | 28–140 mm (5×) f/3.9–5.8 | 3 in 460 kpixel | 107 × 63.4 × 22.6 | 186 g (w/batt.) | | CCD sensor, built-in projector, electronic and lens-based Vibration Reduction, SD card storage with SDXC support | |
| S2600 | Feb 2012 | 14.0 MP; 4320×3240; 1/2.3 in | 26–130 mm (5×) f/3.2–6.5 | 2.7 in 230 kpixel | 93.8 × 58.4 × 19.5 | 121 g (w/batt.) | | | |
| S2700 | Mar 6, 2013 | 16.0 MP; 4608×3456; 1/2.3 in | 26–156 mm (6×) f/3.5–6.5 | 2.7 in 230 kpixel | 94.8 × 57.8 × 20.8 | 125 g (w/batt.) | | CCD sensor, SD card storage with SDXC support, Approx. 210 shots with EN-EL19 battery, EXPEED C2 image-processing engine, HD 720p movie recording, Smart portrait system, Subject tracking, Eye-Fi card support, Motion blur reduction | |
| S2900 | Jan 14, 2015 | 20.1 MP | 26–130 mm (5×) f/3.2–6.5 | 2.7 in 230 kpixel | 94.5 × 58.6 × 19.8 | 119 g (w/batt) | | CCD Sensor, SD card storage with SDXC support, Electronic Vibration Reduction | |
| S3200 | Before or at 2013 | | | | | | | | |
| S3100 | Feb 2011 | | | | | | | | |
| S3300 | Feb 1, 2012 | 16.0 MP; 4608×3456; 1/2.3 in | 26–156 mm (6×) f/3.5–6.5 | 2.7 in 230 kpixel | 94.8 × 57.8 × 19.5 | 128 g (w/batt.) | | | |
| S3700 | Jan 14, 2015 | 20.1 MP 5152×3864 | 25–200 mm (8×) f/3.7–6.6 | 2.7 in 230 kpixel | 95.9 × 58.0 × 20.1 | 118 g (w/batt) | | CCD sensor, Lens-shift and Electronic Vibration Reduction, 720p video recording, SD card storage with SDXC support, ND filter | |
| S4100 | Feb 2011 | 14.0 MP | 26–130 mm (5×) f/3.2–6.5 | 3 in 460 kpixel | 95.0 × 56.8 × 19.9 | 131 g (w/batt) | | CCD sensor, Electronic Vibration Reduction, 720p video recording, SD card storage with SDXC support | |
| S4200 | 2012 | 16.0 MP | 26–156 mm (6×) f/3.5–6.5 | 3 in 460 kpixel | 95.5 × 58.9 × 20.8 | 139 g (w/batt) | | CCD sensor, Electronic Vibration Reduction, 720p video recording, SD card storage with SDXC support | |
| S4300 | Feb 1, 2012 | 16.0 MP; 4608×3456; 1/2.3 in | 26–156 mm (6×) f/3.5–6.5 | 3 in 460 kpixel | 95.5 × 58.9 × 20.8 | 139 g (w/batt.) | | CCD sensor, Lens-shift Vibration Reduction, 720p video recording, SD card storage with SDXC support, ND filter | |
| S6100 | March 2010 | 16.0 MP | 5.0-35.0mm 1:37-5.6 (7x) | 2.7 | | | | CCD Sensor, Touchscreen, 720p Full HD video recording, SD memory card, | |
| S6300 | Feb 1, 2012 | 16.0 MP; 4608×3456; 1/2.3 in | 25–250 mm (10×) f/3.2–5.8 | 2.7 in 230 kpixel | 93.6 × 57.7 × 26.0 | 160 g (w/batt.) | | | |
| S6400 | Aug 22, 2012 | 16.0 MP; 4608×3456; 1/2.3 in | 25–300 mm (12×) f/3.1–6.5 | 3.0 in 460 kpixel | 95.4 × 58.6 × 26.7 | 150 g (w/batt.) | | CMOS sensor, lens-shift Vibration Reduction, 1080p video recording with stereo sound, SD card storage with SDHC and SDXC support | |
| S6900 | Feb 10, 2015 | 16.76 MP; 1/2.3 in | 25–300 mm (12×) f/3.3–6.3 | 3.0 in 460 kpixel | 99.4 × 58.0 × 27.9 | 181 g (w/batt.) | | CMOS sensor, vibration reduction: lens-shift (still images) and electronic (movies), SD card storage with SDHC and SDXC support, articulating screen | |
| S7000 | Feb 10, 2015 | 16 MP | 25–500 mm (20×) f/3.4-6.5 | 3.0 in 460 kpixel | 98.8 x 60.0 x 27.4 | 165 g (w/batt.) | | CMOS sensor, vibration reduction: lens-shift (still images) and electronic (movies), WiFi, 1080p video recording, SD card storage with SDHC and SDXC, ND filter | |
| S8000 | Feb 3, 2010 | 14.0 MP | 10x | 3.0 in 921 kpixel | 103.0 x 57.0 x 27.3 | 183 g (w/batt.) | | CCD sensor, Lens-shift vibration-reduction, 720p video recording, SD card storage, with SDHC and SDXC support | |
| S9200 | Feb 1, 2012 | 16.0 MP; 4608×3456; 1/2.3 in | 25–450 mm (18×) f/3.5–5.9 | 3 in 921 kpixel | 108.7 × 59.8 × 30.6 | 209 g (w/batt.) | | Back-lit CMOS sensor, lens-based Vibration Reduction, 1080p video recording, SD card storage with SDHC and SDXC support | |
| S9300 | Feb 1, 2012 | 16.0 MP; 4608×3456; 1/2.3 in | 25–450 mm (18×) f/3.5–5.9 | 3 in 921 kpixel | 108.7 × 62.3 × 30.6 | 215 g (w/batt.) | | S9200 with built in GPS | |
| S9600 | Feb 7, 2014 | 16.0 MP; 4608×3456; 1/2.3 in | 25–550 mm (22×) f/3.4–6.3 | 3 in 460 kpixel | 108.6 × 61.0 × 31.6 | 206 g (w/batt.) | | Back-lit CMOS sensor, built-in Wi-Fi, 5-axis vibration reduction, 1920 x 1080/60i video recording, SD card storage, Charging AC Adapter EH-71P/EH-71PCH. The lens also supports macro photography. | |
| S9700 | Feb 7, 2014 | 16.0 MP; 4608×3456; 1/2.3 in | 25–750 mm (30×) f/3.7–6.4 | 3 in 921 kpixel | 109.6 × 63.5 × 34.5 | 232 g (w/batt.) | | Back-lit CMOS sensor, built-in Wi-Fi, 5-axis vibration reduction, 1920 x 1080/60i video recording, SD card storage, Charging AC Adapter EH-71P/EH-71PCH. OLED monitor, built-in world map, high-performance GPS/GLONASS function. | |
| S9900 | Feb 10, 2015 | 16.0 MP; 4608×3456; 1/2.3 in | 25–750 mm (30×) f/3.7–6.4 | 3 in 921 kpixel | 112.0 × 66.0 × 39.5 | 289 g (w/batt.) | | Vari-angle TFT LCD monitor, built-in world map supports GPS/GLONASS/QZSS, CMOS sensor, built-in Wi-Fi, combination of Lens-shift and Electronic vibration reduction, SD, SDHC, SDXC card storage, Full HD 1080p videos. | |

== Discontinued models ==
=== Life Series ===
| Model | Release date | Sensor res., size | Lens (35 mm equiv.) zoom, aperture | Screen size, pixels | Dimensions W × H × D (mm) | Weight | Image | Features | Ref. |
| L1 | Sep 1, 2005 | 6.2 MP; 2816×2112; 1/2.5" | 38–190 mm (5×) f/2.9–5 | 2.5"; 115,000 | 89.5 × 60.5 × 47 | 180 g (w/out batt.) | | CCD sensor, AA batteries, D-Lighting, Face-priority AF | |
| L2 | Feb 21, 2006 | 6.0 MP; 2816×2112; 1/2.5" | 38–116 mm (3×) f/3.2–5.3 | 2.0"; 86,000 | 91 × 60.5 × 26 | 120 g (w/out batt.) | | CCD sensor, AA batteries, D-Lighting, Face-priority AF | |
| L3 | Feb 21, 2006 | 5.1 MP; 2592×1944; 1/2.5" | 38–116 mm (3×) f/3.2–5.3 | 2.0"; 86,000 | 91 × 60.5 × 26 | 120 g (w/out batt.) | | CCD sensor, AA batteries, D-Lighting, Face-priority AF | |
| L4 | Feb 21, 2006 | 4.0 MP; 2272×1704; 1/2.5" | 38–114 mm (3×) f/2.8–4.9 | 2.0"; 115,000 | 86.5 × 60.5 × 34.5 | 115 g (w/out batt.) | | CCD sensor, AA batteries, D-Lighting, Face-priority AF | |
| L5 | Aug 24, 2006 | 7.2 MP; 3072×2304; 1/2.5" | 38–190 mm (5×) f/2.9–5 | 2.5"; 115,000 | 97 × 61 × 45 | 170 g (w/out batt.) | | CCD sensor, AA batteries, D-Lighting, Face-priority AF, lens-based Vibration Reduction | |
| L6 | Aug 24, 2006 | 6.0 MP; 2816×2112; 1/2.5" | 38–116 mm (3×) f/3.2–5.3 | 2.5"; 115,000 | 91 × 60.5 × 26 | 125 g (w/out batt.) | | CCD sensor, AA batteries, D-Lighting, Face-priority AF | |
| L10 | Feb 20, 2007 | 5.0 MP; 2560×1920; 1/2.5" | 37.5–112.5mm (3×) f/2.8–5.2 | 2.0"; 153,000 | 89.5 × 60.5 × 26 | 115 g (w/out batt.) | | CCD sensor, AA batteries, D-Lighting, Face-priority AF | |
| L11 | Feb 20, 2007 | 6.0 MP; 2816×2112; 1/2.5" | 37.5–112.5mm (3×) f/2.8–5.2 | 2.4"; 115,000 | 89.5 × 60.5 × 27 | 125 g (w/out batt.) | | CCD sensor, AA batteries, D-Lighting, Face-priority AF, ImageLink | |
| L12 | Feb 20, 2007 | 7.1 MP; 3072×2304; 1/2.5" | 35–105 mm (3×) f/2.8–4.7 | 2.5"; 115,000 | 91 × 61 × 26 | 125 g (w/out batt.) | | CCD sensor, AA batteries, D-Lighting, Face-priority AF, lens-based Vibration Reduction, up to ISO 1600 | |
| L14 | Aug 30, 2007 | 7.1 MP; 3072×2304; 1/2.5" | 38–114 mm (3×) f/3.1–5.9 | 2.4"; 115,000 | 90.5 × 61.5 × 27 | 115 g (w/out batt.) | | CCD sensor, AA batteries, D-Lighting, Face-priority AF, stop motion video, up to ISO 1000 | |
| L15 | Aug 30, 2007 | 8.0 MP; 3246×2448; 1/2.5" | 35–105 mm (3×) f/2.8–4.7 | 2.8"; 230,000 | 91 × 61 × 29.5 | 125 g (w/out batt.) | | CCD sensor, AA batteries, D-Lighting, Face-priority AF, lens-based Vibration Reduction | |
| L16 | Jan 29, 2008 | 7.1 MP; 3072×2304; 1/2.5" | 35–105 mm (3×) f/2.8–4.7 | 2.8"; 230,000 | 95 × 61 × 29.5 | 125 g (w/out batt.) | | CCD sensor, AA batteries, D-Lighting, Face-priority AF, up to ISO 1600 | |
| L18 | Jan 29, 2008 | 8.0 MP; 3264×2448; 1/2.5" | 35–105 mm (3×) f/2.8–4.7 | 3.0"; 230,000 | 95 × 61 × 29.5 | 125 g (w/out batt.) | | CCD sensor, AA batteries, D-Lighting, Face-priority AF, up to ISO 1600 | |
| L19 | Feb 3, 2009 | 8.0 MP; 3264×2448; 1/2.5" | 41–145 mm (3.6×) f/3.1–6.7 | 2.7"; 230,000 | 96.5 × 61 × 29 | 130 g (w/out batt.) | | CCD sensor, AA batteries, D-Lighting, Face-priority AF, up to ISO 1600 | |
| L20 | Feb 3, 2009 | 10.0 MP; 3648×2736; 1/2.3" | 38–136 mm (3.6×) f/3.1–6.7 | 3.0"; 230,000 | 96.5 × 61 × 29 | 135 g (w/out batt.) | | CCD sensor, AA batteries, D-Lighting, Face-priority AF, up to ISO 1600 | |
| L21 | Feb 3, 2010 | 8 MP; 3264×2448; 1/2.5" | 41–145 mm (3.6×) f/3.1–6.7 | 2.5"; 230,000 | 92 × 61.1 × 28.3 | 169 g (w/batt.) | | Uses AA batteries, CCD sensor, electronic Vibration Reduction, SD card storage | |
| L22 | Feb 3, 2010 | 12 MP; 4000×3000; 1/2.3" | 37–134 mm (3.6×) f/3.1–6.7 | 3"; 230,000 | 97.7 × 60.5 × 28.3 | 183 g (w/batt.) | | Uses AA batteries, CCD sensor, electronic Vibration Reduction, SD card storage | |
| L23 | Feb 9, 2011 | 10.1 MP; 3648×2736; 1/2.9" | 28–140 mm (5×) f/2.7–6.8 | 2.7"; 230,000 | 96.7 × 59.9 × 29.3 | 170 g (w/batt.) | | Uses AA batteries, CCD sensor, electronic Vibration Reduction, SD card storage | |
| L24 | Feb 9, 2011 | 14 MP; 4320×3240; 1/3" | 6.7–24 mm (3.6×) f/3.1–6.7 | 3"; 230,000 | 60.5 × 97.7 × 28.3 | 182 g (w/batt.) | | Uses AA batteries, CCD sensor, electronic Vibration Reduction, SD card storage | |
| L100 | Feb 3, 2009 | 10.0 MP; 3648×2736; 1/2.33" | 28–420 mm (15×) f/3.5–5.4 | 3.0"; 230,000 | 110 × 72 × 78 | 355 g (w/out batt.) | | CCD sensor, AA batteries, D-Lighting, Face-priority AF, lens-based Vibration Reduction, up to ISO 3200 | |
| L110 | Feb 3, 2010 | 12.1 MP; 4000×3000; 1/2.3" | 28–420 mm (15×) f/3.5–5.4 | 3"; 460,000 | 108.9 × 74.3 × 78.1 | 406 g (w/batt.) | | Uses AA batteries, CCD sensor, sensor-based and electronic Vibration Reduction, up to 6,400 ISO, 720p video recording with stereo sound, SD card storage | |
| L120 | Feb 9, 2011 | 14.1 MP; 4320×3240; 1/2.3" | 25–525 mm (21×) f/3.1–5.8 | 3"; 920,000 | 109.9 × 76.5 × 78.4 | 431 g (w/battery.) | | Uses AA batteries, CCD sensor, sensor-based and electronic Vibration Reduction, up to 6,400 ISO, 720p video recording with stereo sound, SD card storage | |

=== Performance Series ===
| Model | Release date | Sensor res., size | Lens (35 mm equiv.) zoom, aperture | Screen size, pixels | Dimensions W (mm) × H (mm) × D (mm) | Weight | Image | Features | Ref. |
| P1 | Sep 1, 2005 | 8.0 MP; 3264×2448; 1/1.8" | 36–126 mm (3.5×) f/2.7–5.2 | 2.5"; 110,000 | 91 × 60 × 39 | 170 g (w/out batt.) | | CCD sensor, electronic Vibration Reduction (during video), aperture priority mode, Wireless 802.11b/g transfer support. | |
| P2 | Sep 1, 2005 | 5.0 MP; 2592×1944; 1/1.8" | 36–126 mm (3.5×) f/2.7–5.2 | 2.5"; 110,000 | 91 × 60 × 39 | 170 g (w/out batt.) | | CCD sensor, electronic Vibration Reduction (during video), aperture priority mode, Wireless 802.11b/g transfer support. | |
| P3 | Feb 21, 2006 | 8.1 MP; 3264×2448; 1/1.8" | 36–126 mm (3.5×) f/2.7–5.3 | 2.5"; 110,000 | 92 × 61 × 31 | 170 g (w/out batt.) | | CCD sensor, lens-based Vibration Reduction, Wireless 802.11b/g transfer support. | |
| P4 | Feb 21, 2006 | 8.1 MP; 3264×2448; 1/1.8" | 36–126 mm (3.5×) f/2.7–5.3 | 2.5"; 110,000 | 92 × 61 × 31 | 170 g (w/out batt.) | | P3 without Wireless 802.11b/g transfer support. | |
| P50 | Aug 30, 2007 | 8.1 MP; 3264×2448; 1/2.5" | 28–102 mm (3.6×) f/2.8–5.6 | 2.4"; 115,000 | 94.5 × 66 × 44 | 160 g (w/out batt.) | | CCD sensor, AA batteries, electronic Vibration Reduction, sensitivity up to ISO 2000. | |
| P60 | Jan 29, 2008 | 8.1 MP; 3264×2448; 1/2.5" | 36–180 mm (5×) f/3.6–4.5 | 2.5"; 153,000 | 95.5 × 63.5 × 36 | 160 g (w/out batt.) | | CCD sensor, AA batteries, sensor-based Vibration Reduction, D-Lighting, Face-priority AF, sensitivity up to ISO 2000. | |
| P80 | Apr 10, 2008 | 10.1 MP; 3648×2736; 1/2.33" | 27–486 mm (18×) f/2.8–4.5 | 2.7"; 230,000 | 110 × 79 × 78 | 365 g (w/out batt.) | | CCD sensor, lens-based Vibration Reduction, sensitivity up to ISO 6400, 6 frame/s continuous shooting. | |
| P90 | Feb 3, 2009 | 12.1 MP; 4000×3000; 1/2.33" | 26–624 mm (24×) f/2.8–5 | 3"; 230,000 | 114 × 83 × 99 | 460 g (w/out batt.) | | CCD sensor, variable angle LCD screen, sensor-based Vibration Reduction, sensitivity up to ISO 6400. | |
| P100 | Feb 3, 2010 | 10.3 MP; 3648×2736; 1/2.3" | 26–678 mm (26×) f/2.8–5 | 3"; 460,000 | 114.4 × 82.7 × 98.6 | 481 g (w/batt.) | | 10 frame/s shooting, back illuminated CMOS sensor, 1080p HD video recording with stereo sound, tilting LCD, sensor-based Vibration Reduction, SD card storage | |
| P300 | Feb 9, 2011 | 12.2 MP; 4000×3000; 1/2.3" | 24–100 mm (4.2×) f/1.8–4.9 | 3"; 921,000 | 103 × 58.3 × 32 | 189 g (w/batt.) | | Back illuminated CMOS sensor, fast f/1.8 lens, 1080p video recording, lens-based Vibration Reduction, SD(SDHC, SDXC) card storage | |
| P500 | Feb 9, 2011 | 12.1 MP; 4000×3000; 1/2.3" | 22.5–810 mm (36×) f/3.4–5.7 | 3"; 921,000 | 115.5 × 83.7 × 102.5 | 494 g (w/batt.) | | CMOS sensor, sensor-based and electronic Vibration Reduction, tiltable LCD screen, EXPEED C2 dual image processors, 1080p video recording with stereo sound, SD(SDHC, SDXC) card storage | |
| P5000 | Feb 20, 2007 | 10.0 MP; 3648×2736; 1/1.8" | 36–126 mm (3.5×) f/2.7–5.3 | 2.5"; 230,000 | 98 × 64.5 × 41 | 200 g (w/out batt.) | | CCD sensor, lens-based Vibration Reduction, sensitivity up to ISO 3200. | |
| P5100 | Aug 30, 2007 | 12.1 MP; 4000×3000; 1/1.72" | 35–123 mm (3.5×) f/2.7–5.3 | 2.5"; 230,000 | 98 × 64.5 × 41 | 200 g (w/out batt.) | | CCD sensor, lens-based Vibration Reduction, Magnesium alloy body, sensitivity up to ISO 3200. | |
| P6000 | Aug 7, 2008 | 13.5 MP; 4224×3168; 1/1.7" | 28–112 mm (4×) f/2.7–5.9 | 2.7"; 230,000 | 107 × 65.5 × 42 | 240 g (w/out batt.) | | CCD sensor, built-in GPS geotagging, lens-based Vibration Reduction, sensitivity up to ISO 6400. | |
| P7000 | Sep 8, 2010 | 10.2 MP; 3264×2448; 1/1.7" | 28–200 mm (7.1×) f/2.8–5.6 | 3"; 921,000 | 114.2 × 77 × 44.8 | 360 g (w/batt.) | | 10 frame/s shooting, 1/1.7" CCD sensor, 720p HD video recording with stereo sound, lens-based Vibration Reduction, SD card storage with SDXC support, NRW (RAW) image support. | |
| P7100 | Aug 26, 2011 | 10.1 MP; 3648×2736; 1/1.7" | 28–200 mm (7.1×) f/2.8–5.6 | 3"; 921,000 | 116 × 77 × 48 | 395 g (w/batt.) | | Tilting LCD screen, CCD sensor, 720p HD video recording with stereo sound, lens-based Vibration Reduction, SD card storage with SDXC support, NRW (RAW) image support. | |

=== Style Series ===
| Model | Release date | Sensor res., size | Lens (35 mm equiv.) zoom, aperture | Screen size, pixels | Dimensions W (mm) × H (mm) × D (mm) | Weight | Image | Features and notes | Ref. |
| S1 | Mar 16, 2005 | 5.1 MP; 2592×1944; 1/2.5″ | 35–105 mm (3×) f/3–5.4 | 2.5″ 110,000 | 89.9 × 57.5 × 19.7 | 118 g (w/out batt.) | | Aluminium body, CCD sensor, 17 scene modes, SD card storage. First Style series camera. | |
| S2 | May 18, 2005 | 5.1 MP; 2592×1944; 1/2.5″ | 35–105 mm (3×) f/3–5.4 | 2.5″ 110,000 | 91.9 × 59 × 22 | 140 g (w/out batt.) | | Weather sealed Aluminium body, CCD sensor, 17 scene modes, SD card storage. | |
| S3 | Sep 1, 2005 | 5.9 MP; 2816×2112; 1/2.5″ | 35–105 mm (3×) f/3–5.4 | 2.5″ 110,000 | 89.9 × 57.5 × 19.7 | 118 g (w/out batt.) | | Aluminium body, CCD sensor, 17 scene modes, Face-priority AF, SD card storage. | |
| S4 | Sep 1, 2005 | 5.9 MP; 2816×2112; 1/2.5″ | 38–380 mm (10×) f/3.5 | 2.5″ 110,000 | 111.5 × 68.5 × 37 | 205 g (w/out batt.) | | Uses AA batteries, CCD sensor, 17 scene modes, swivel lens design, Face-priority AF, SD card storage. | |
| S5 | Feb 21, 2006 | 5.9 MP; 2816×2112; 1/2.5″ | 35–105 mm (3×) f/3–5.4 | 3″ 230,000 | 93 × 59 × 20 | 135 g (w/out batt.) | | CCD sensor, 15 scene modes, Pictmotion, Face-priority AF, SD card storage. | |
| S6 | Feb 21, 2006 | 5.9 MP; 2816×2112; 1/2.5″ | 35–105 mm (3×) f/3–5.4 | 3″ 230,000 | 100.5 × 60 × 21 | 140 g (w/out batt.) | | CCD sensor, 15 scene modes, Pictmotion, Face-priority AF, Wireless b/g transfer support, SD card storage. | |
| S7 | Aug 24, 2006 | 7.1 MP; 3072×2304; 1/2.5″ | 35–105 mm (3×) f/2.8–5 | 3″ 230,000 | 100.5 × 60 × 21 | 135 g (w/out batt.) | | CCD sensor, electronic Vibration Reduction, Pictmotion, Face-priority AF, SD card storage. | |
| S7c | Aug 24, 2006 | 7.1 MP; 3072×2304; 1/2.5″ | 35–105 mm (3×) f/2.8–5 | 3″ 230,000 | 100.5 × 60 × 21 | 140 g (w/out batt.) | | S7 with Wireless 802.11b/g transfer support. | |
| S8 | Aug 24, 2006 | 7.1 MP; 3072×2304; 1/2.5″ | 35–105 mm (3×) f/2.8–5 | 2.5″ 230,000 | 93 × 59 × 20 | 135 g (w/out batt.) | | CCD sensor, electronic Vibration Reduction, Pictmotion, Face-priority AF, SD card storage. | |
| S9 | Aug 24, 2006 | 5.9 MP; 2816×2112; 1/2.5″ | 38–114 mm (3×) f/3.5–4.3 | 2.5″ 153,600 | 90.5 × 58 × 20.4 | 115 g (w/out batt.) | | CCD sensor, Stop-motion video, Pictmotion, Face-priority AF, SD card storage. | |
| S10 | Aug 24, 2006 | 6 MP; 2816×2112; 1/2.5″ | 38–380 mm (10×) f/3.5 | 2.5″ 230,000 | 112.5 × 74.5 × 40.5 | 220 g (w/out batt.) | | CCD sensor, sensor-based Vibration Reduction, Pictmotion, swivel lens design, Face-priority AF, SD card storage. | |
| S50 | Feb 20, 2007 | 7.2 MP; 3072×2304; 1/2.5″ | 38–114 mm (3×) f/3.3–4.2 | 3″ 230,000 | 92.5 × 59 × 21 | 125 g (w/out batt.) | | CCD sensor, lens-based Vibration Reduction, Pictmotion, SD card storage. | |
| S50c | Feb 20, 2007 | 7.2 MP; 3072×2304; 1/2.5″ | 38–114 mm (3×) f/3.3–4.2 | 3″ 230,000 | 97.5 × 59 × 21 | 125 g (w/out batt.) | | S50 with Wireless 802.11b/g transfer support. | |
| S51 | Aug 30, 2007 | 8.1 MP; 3246×2448; 1/2.5″ | 38–114 mm (3×) f/3.3–4.2 | 3″ 230,000 | 92.5 × 59 × 21 | 125 g (w/out batt.) | | CCD sensor, lens-based Vibration Reduction, Pictmotion, SD card storage. | |
| S51c | Aug 30, 2007 | 8.1 MP; 3246×2448; 1/2.5″ | 38–114 mm (3×) f/3.3–4.2 | 3″ 230,000 | 97.5 × 59 × 21 | 125 g (w/out batt.) | | S51 with Wireless 802.11b/g transfer support. | |
| S52 | Apr 10, 2008 | 9.0 MP; 3456×2592; 1/2.5″ | 38–114 mm (3×) f/3.3–4.2 | 3″ 230,000 | 93 × 59 × 21 | 125 g (w/out batt.) | | CCD sensor, lens-based Vibration Reduction, Pictmotion, SD card storage, sensitivity up to ISO 3200. | |
| S52c | Apr 10, 2008 | 9.0 MP; 3456×2592; 1/2.5″ | 38–114 mm (3×) f/3.3–4.2 | 3″ 230,000 | 97.5 × 59 × 21 | 125 g (w/out batt.) | | S52 with Wireless 802.11b/g transfer support. | |
| S60 | Aug 7, 2008 | 10.0 MP; 3648×2736; 1/2.3″ | 33–165 mm (5×) f/3.8–4.8 | 3.5″ 230,000 | 97.5 × 60 × 22 | 145 g (w/out batt.) | | CCD sensor, 3.5 inch touchscreen LCD, sensor-based Vibration Reduction, Pictmotion, SD card storage, sensitivity up to ISO 3200. | |
| S70 | Aug 4, 2009 | 12.1 MP; 4000×3000; 1/2.3″ | 28–140 mm (5×) f/3.9–5.8 | 3.5″ 288,000 | 96.5 × 60.5 × 20 | 140 g (w/o batt.) | | OLED touch screen, CCD sensor, lens-based Vibration Reduction, up to 6,400 ISO, SD card storage | |
| S80 | Sep 8, 2010 | 14.1 MP; 4320×3240; 1/2.3″ | 35–175 mm (5×) f/3.6–4.8 | 3.5″ 819,000 | 98.8 × 62.6 × 16.5 | 133 g (w/batt.) | | CCD sensor, 3.5″ Widescreen OLED touch screen, 720p HD video recording with stereo sound, lens-based Vibration Reduction, SD card storage with SDXC support | |
| S100 | Aug 24, 2011 | 16.0 MP; 4608×3456; 1/2.3" | 28–140 mm (5×) f/3.9–4.8 | 3.5"; 820,000 | 99 × 65.2 × 18.1 | 138 g (w/batt.) | | CMOS sensor, 3.5" Widescreen OLED touch screen, 1080p HD video recording with stereo sound, lens-based Vibration Reduction, SD card storage with SDXC support | |
| S200 | Feb 20, 2007 | 7.1 MP; 3072×2304; 1/2.5″ | 38–114 mm (3×) f/3.1–5.9 | 2.5″ 153,000 | 91.5 × 56.5 × 18.5 | 125 g (w/out batt.) | | CCD sensor, electronic Vibration Reduction, D-Lighting, PictBridge, SD card storage. | |
| S210 | Jan 29, 2008 | 8.0 MP; 3264×2448; 1/2.5″ | 38–114 mm (3×) f/3.1–5.9 | 2.5″ 230,000 | 90 × 55.5 × 18 | 100 g (w/out batt.) | | CCD sensor, electronic Vibration Reduction, D-Lighting, PictBridge, SD card storage. | |
| S220 | Feb 3, 2009 | 10.0 MP; 3648×2736; 1/2.3″ | 35–105 mm (3×) f/3.1–5.9 | 2.5″ 150,000 | 89.5 × 55.5 × 18 | 100 g (w/out batt.) | | CCD sensor, electronic Vibration Reduction, automatic scene mode selection, D-Lighting, PictBridge, SD card storage. | |
| S230 | Feb 3, 2009 | 10.0 MP; 3648×2736; 1/2.3″ | 35–105 mm (3×) f/3.1–5.9 | 3″ 230,000 | 91 × 57 × 20 | 115 g (w/out batt.) | | S220 with 3-inch (76 mm) touchscreen LCD | |
| S500 | Feb 20, 2007 | 7.1 MP; 3072×2304; 1/2.5″ | 35–105 mm (3×) f/2.8–4.7 | 2.5″ 230,000 | 88 × 51 × 22 | 125 g (w/out batt.) | | CCD sensor, lens-based Vibration Reduction, SD card storage, sensitivity up to ISO 2000. | |
| S510 | Aug 30, 2007 | 8.1 MP; 3246×2448; 1/2.5″ | 35–105 mm (3×) f/2.8–4.7 | 2.5″ 230,000 | 88 × 51 × 22 | 125 g (w/out batt.) | | CCD sensor, lens-based Vibration Reduction, SD card storage, sensitivity up to ISO 2000. | |
| S520 | Jan 29, 2008 | 8.0 MP; 3264×2448; 1/2.5″ | 35–105 mm (3×) f/2.8–4.7 | 2.5″ 153,000 | 94 × 53 × 22 | 115 g (w/out batt.) | | CCD sensor, lens-based Vibration Reduction, SD card storage, sensitivity up to ISO 2000. | |
| S550 | Jan 29, 2008 | 10.0 MP; 3648×2736; 1/2.3″ | 36–180 mm (5×) f/3.5–5.6 | 2.5″ 230,000 | 90 × 53.5 × 22 | 120 g (w/out batt.) | | CCD sensor, lens-based Vibration Reduction, SD card storage, sensitivity up to ISO 2000. | |
| S560 | Aug 7, 2008 | 10.0 MP; 3648×2736; 1/2.33″ | 34.8–174 mm (5×) f/3.5–5.6 | 2.7″ 230,000 | 93 × 54.5 × 23.5 | 130 g (w/out batt.) | | CCD sensor, sensor-based Vibration Reduction, SD card storage, sensitivity up to ISO 3200. | |
| S570 | Aug 4, 2009 | 12.0 MP; 4000×3000; 1/2.3″ | 28–140 mm (5×) f/2.7–6.6 | 2.7″ 230,000 | 92 × 56.5 × 21.5 | 120 g (w/o batt.) | | CCD sensor, electronic Vibration Reduction, 16 scene modes, SD card storage | |
| S600 | Jan 29, 2008 | 10.0 MP; 3648×2736; 1/2.33″ | 28–112 mm (4×) f/2.7–5.8 | 2.7″ 230,000 | 88.5 × 53 × 22.5 | 130 g (w/o batt.) | | CCD sensor, lens-based Vibration Reduction, SD card storage, sensitivity up to ISO 3200. | |
| S610 | Aug 7, 2008 | 10.0 MP; 3648×2736; 1/2.33″ | 28–112 mm (4×) f/2.7–5.8 | 3.0″ 230,000 | 94 × 57 × 22.5 | 125 g (w/out batt.) | | CCD sensor, lens-based Vibration Reduction, SD card storage, sensitivity up to ISO 3200. | |
| S610c | Aug 7, 2008 | 10.0 MP; 3648×2736; 1/2.33″ | 28–112 mm (4×) f/2.7–5.8 | 3.0″ 230,000 | 96.5 × 57 × 22.5 | 130 g (w/out batt.) | | S610 with Wireless 802.11b/g transfer support. | |
| S620 | Feb 3, 2009 | 12.2 MP; 4000×3000; 1/2.33″ | 28–112 mm (4×) f/2.7–5.8 | 2.7″ 230,000 | 90 × 53 × 23 | 120 g (w/o batt.) | | CCD sensor, lens-based Vibration Reduction, SD card storage. | |
| S630 | Feb 3, 2009 | 12.0 MP; 4000×3000; 1/2.33″ | 37–260 mm (7×) f/3.5–5.3 | 2.7″ 230,000 | 96.5 × 57.5 × 25.5 | 140 g (w/o batt.) | | CCD sensor, sensor-based Vibration Reduction, SD card storage, sensitivity up to ISO 6400. | |
| S640 | Aug 4, 2009 | 12.2 MP; 4000×3000; 1/2.3″ | 28–140 mm (5×) f/2.7–6.6 | 2.7″ 230,000 | 91 × 55 × 20.5 | 110 g (w/o batt.) | | CCD sensor, lens-based Vibration Reduction, up to 6,400 ISO, SD card storage | |
| S700 | Aug 30, 2007 | 12.1 MP; 4000×3000; 1/1.72″ | 37–111 mm (3×) f/2.8–5.4 | 2.7″ 230,000 | 89 × 54 × 23 | 130 g (w/o batt.) | | CCD sensor, sensor-based Vibration Reduction, SD card storage, sensitivity up to ISO 3200. | |
| S710 | Aug 7, 2008 | 14.5 MP; 4352×3264; 1/1.72″ | 28–101 mm (3.6×) f/2.8–5.6 | 3.0″ 230,000 | 92.5 × 57.5 × 24 | 155 g (w/o batt.) | | CCD sensor, lens-based Vibration Reduction, SD card storage, sensitivity up to ISO 12800. | |
| S1000pj | Aug 4, 2009 | 12.1 MP; 4000×3000; 1/2.3″ | 28–140 mm (5×) f/3.9–5.8 | 2.7″ 230,000 | 99.5 × 62.5 × 23 | 155 g (w/o batt.) | | CCD sensor, built-in projector, lens-based Vibration Reduction, SD card storage | |
| S1100pj | Aug 17, 2010 | 14.1 MP; 4320×3240; 1/2.3″ | 28–140 mm (5×) f/3.9–5.8 | 3″ 460,000 | 100 × 62.7 × 24.1 | 180 g (w/batt.) | | CCD sensor, built-in projector, lens-based Vibration Reduction, SD card storage | |
| S3000 | Feb 3, 2010 | 12.0 MP; 4000×3000; 1/2.3″ | 27–108 mm (4×) f/3.2–5.9 | 2.7″ 230,000 | 94.3 × 55.9 × 19 | 116 g (w/batt.) | | CCD sensor, electronic Vibration Reduction, SD card storage | |
| S3200 | | | | | | | | | |
| S3300 | | | | | | | | | |
| S4000 | Feb 3, 2010 | 12.0 MP; 4000×3000; 1/2.3″ | 27–108 mm (4×) f/3.2–5.9 | 3″ 460,000 | 94.5 × 56.5 × 20.4 | 131 g (w/batt.) | | CCD sensor, touch screen LCD, electronic Vibration Reduction, SD card storage | |
| S6000 | Feb 3, 2010 | 14.2 MP; 4320×3240; 1/2.3″ | 28–196 mm (7×) f/3.7–5.6 | 2.7″ 230,000 | 97 × 55.5 × 25 | 156 g (w/batt.) | | CCD sensor, 0.75 s start up time, lens-based Vibration Reduction, 720p video recording, SD card storage | |
| S8000 | Feb 3, 2010 | 14.2 MP; 4320×3240; 1/2.3″ | 30–300 mm (10×) f/3.5–5.6 | 3″ 921,000 | 103 × 57 × 27.3 | 183 g (w/batt.) | | CCD sensor, lens-based Vibration Reduction, 720p video recording with stereo sound, SD card storage | |
| S8100 | Sep 8, 2010 | 12.1 MP; 4000×3000; 1/2.3″ | 30–300 mm (10×) f/3.5–5.6 | 3″ 921,000 | 104 × 59.2 × 29.9 | 209 g (w/batt.) | | Back illuminated CMOS sensor, 10 frame/s continuous shooting, 1080p HD video recording with stereo sound, lens-based and electronic Vibration Reduction, SD card storage with SDHC and SDXC support | |
| SQ | Feb 18, 2003 | 3.1 MP; 2016×1512; 1/2.7″ | 37–111 mm (3×) f/2.7–4.8 | 1.5″ 117,600 | 82 × 82 × 25.5 | 180g (w/out batt.) | | Aluminium body, CCD sensor, 17 scene modes, swivel lens, SD card storage. | |
| S2500 | Feb 9, 2011 | 12.0 MP; 4000×3000; 1/2.3" | 27–108 mm (4×) f/3.2–5.9 | 2.7"; 230,000 | 93.1 × 57.1 × 20 | 117 g (w/batt.) | | CCD sensor, electronic Vibration Reduction, SD card storage | |
| S3100 | Feb 9, 2011 | 14.0 MP; 4320×3240; 1/2.3" | 26–130 mm (5×) f/3.2–6.5 | 2.7"; 230,000 | 93.5 × 57.5 × 18.4 | 118 g (w/batt.) | | CCD sensor, electronic Vibration Reduction, 720p video recording, SD card storage | |
| S4100 | Feb 9, 2011 | 14.0 MP; 4320×3240; 1/2.3" | 26–130 mm (5×) f/3.2–6.5 | 3"; 460,000 | 95 × 56.8 × 19.9 | 131 g (w/batt.) | | 3-inch LCD touch screen, CCD sensor, electronic Vibration Reduction, 720p video recording, SD card storage | |
| S4150 | Aug 24, 2011 | 14.0 MP; 4320×3240; 1/2.3" | 26–130 mm (5×) f/3.2–6.5 | 3"; 460,000 | 95 × 56.8 × 19.9 | 128 g (w/batt.) | | S4100 with improved LCD screen | |
| S5100 | Aug 17, 2010 | 12.2 MP; 4000×3000; 1/2.3" | 28–140 mm (5×) f/2.7–6.6 | 2.7"; 230,000 | 97.1 × 56.9 × 21.6 | 132 g (w/batt.) | | CCD sensor, 0.75 s start up time, lens-based Vibration Reduction, 720p video recording, SD card storage | |
| S6100 | Feb 9, 2011 | 16.0 MP; 4608×3456; 1/2.3" | 28–196 mm (7×) f/3.7–5.6 | 3"; 460,000 | 97.9 × 58 × 26.6 | 175 g (w/batt.) | | 3-inch LCD touch screen, CCD sensor, lens-based Vibration Reduction, 720p video recording, SD card storage | |
| S6150 | Aug 24, 2011 | 16.0 MP; 4608×3456; 1/2.3" | 28–196 mm (7×) f/3.7–5.6 | 3"; 460,000 | 97.9 × 58 × 26.6 | 172 g (w/batt.) | | S6100 with improved LCD screen | |
| S6200 | Aug 24, 2011 | 16.0 MP; 4608×3456; 1/2.3" | 25–250 mm (10×) f/3.3–5.8 | 2.7"; 230,000 | 93 × 56.7 × 25.4 | 160 g (w/batt.) | | CCD sensor, lens-based Vibration Reduction, 720p video recording, SD card storage with SDXC support | |
| S6300 | Feb 15, 2012 | 16.0 MP 4608x3456 1/2.3” | 25-250mm (10x) F3.2–5.8 | | | | | | |
| S8200 | Aug 24, 2011 | 16.1 MP; 4608×3456; 1/2.3" | 25–350mm (14×) f/3.3–5.9 | 3"; 921,000 | 103.7 × 59.3 × 32.7 | 213 g (w/batt.) | | Back illuminated CMOS sensor, 6 frame/s continuous shooting, 1080p HD video recording with stereo sound, lens-based and electronic Vibration Reduction, SD card storage with SDHC and SDXC support | |
| S9100 | Feb 9, 2011 | 12.1 MP; 4000×3000; 1/2.3" | 25–450 mm (18×) f/3.5–5.9 | 3"; 921,000 | 104.8 × 62 × 34.6 | 214 g (w/batt.) | | CMOS sensor, sensor-based Vibration Reduction, 1080p video recording, SD card storage | |

=== Coolpix xxx ===
| Model | Release date | Sensor res., size | Lens (35 mm equiv.) zoom, aperture | Screen size, pixels | Dimensions W (mm) × H (mm) × D (mm) | Weight | Image | Features | Ref. |
| 100 | Jan, 1997 | 0.3 MP; 512×480; 1/3" | 52 mm (fixed) f/4 | – | 60 × 155 × 35 | 160 g (w/o batt.) | | First Coolpix model, CCD sensor, AA batteries, PCMCIA interface, 1 MB internal memory | |
| 300 | Jan, 1997 | 0.3 MP; 640×480; 1/3" | 45 mm (fixed) f/4 | 2.5" – | 78 × 151 × 35 | 240 g (w/o batt.) | | CCD sensor, AA batteries, 2.5-inch touch-screen, serial and SCSI interface, 4 MB internal memory | |
| 600 | Mar 16, 1998 | 0.8 MP; 1024×768; 1/2.7" | 36 mm (fixed) f/2.8 | 2"; 113,580 | 109.5 × 60 × 44.5 | 210 g (w/o batt.) | | CCD sensor, AA batteries, detachable flash, CF card storage | |
| 700 | Feb 15, 1999 | 1.9 MP; 1600×1200; 1/2" | 35 mm (fixed) f/2.6 | 1.8"; 112,000 | 114 × 67 × 38.5 | 270 g (w/o batt.) | | CCD sensor, AA batteries, CF card storage | |
| 775 | Apr 25, 2001 | 1.9 MP; 1600×1200; 1/2.7" | 38–115 mm (3×) f/2.8–4.9 | 1.5"; 110,000 | 87 × 66.5 × 44 | 230 g (w/batt.) | | CCD sensor, CF card storage | |
| 800 | Sep 27, 1999 | 1.9 MP; 1600×1200; 1/2" | 38–76 mm (2×) f/3.5–4.8 | 1.8"; 112,000 | 119 × 69 × 61 | 360 g (w/batt.) | | CCD sensor, AA batteries, CF card storage | |
| 880 | Aug 28, 2000 | 3.1 MP; 2048×1536; 1/1.8" | 38–95 mm (2.5×) f/2.8–7.8 | 1.8"; 112,000 | 99.5 × 75 × 53 | 320 g (w/batt.) | | CCD sensor, rechargeable battery, CF card storage | |
| 885 | Aug 23, 2001 | 3.1 MP; 2048×1536; 1/1.8" | 38–114 mm (3×) f/2.8–7.6 | 1.5"; 110,000 | 95 × 69 × 52 | 286 g (w/batt.) | | CCD sensor, rechargeable battery, CF card storage | |
| 900 | Mar 16, 1998 | 1.2 MP; 1280×960; 1/2.7" | 38–115 mm (3×) f/2.4–3.6 | 2"; 114,000 | 157 × 75 × 35 | 420 g (w/batt.) | | CCD sensor, aluminium chassis, swivel body, AA batteries, CF card storage | |
| 900S | Oct 26, 1998 | 1.2 MP; 1280×960; 1/2.7" | 38–115 mm (3×) f/2.4–3.6 | 2"; 114,000 | 157 × 75 × 35 | 420 g (w/batt.) | | Updated Coolpix 900 | |
| 950 | Feb 15, 1999 | 1.9 MP; 1600×1200; 1/2" | 38–115 mm (3×) f/2.6–4 | 2"; 130,000 | 143 × 76.5 × 36.5 | 480 g (w/batt.) | | CCD sensor, swivel body, AA batteries, CF card storage | |
| 990 | Jan 27, 2000 | 3.1 MP; 2048×1536; 1/1.8" | 38–115 mm (3×) f/2.5–7 | 1.8"; 112,000 | 143 × 79 × 38 | 450 g (w/batt.) | | CCD sensor, swivel body, AA batteries, CF card storage | |
| 995 | Apr 25, 2001 | 3.1 MP; 2048×1536; 1/1.8" | 38–152 mm (4×) f/2.6–10 | 1.8"; 112,000 | 138 × 82 × 40 | 420 g (w/batt.) | | CCD sensor, swivel body, rechargeable battery, CF card storage | |

=== Coolpix 2xxx ===
| Model | Release date | Sensor res., size | Lens (35 mm equiv.) zoom, aperture | Screen size, pixels | Dimensions W (mm) × H (mm) × D (mm) | Weight | Image | Features | Ref. |
| 2000 | May 29, 2002 | 2.0 MP; 1632×1224; 1/2.7" | 38–114 mm (3×) f/2.8–4.9 | 1.5"; 110,000 | 108 × 69 × 38 | 190 g (w/out batt.) | | Uses 4 AA batteries, CCD sensor, CF Type I card storage | |
| 2100 | Feb 18, 2002 | 2.0 MP; 1600×1200; 1/3.2" | 36–108 mm (3×) f/2.6–4.7 | 1.5"; 75,000 | 87.5 × 65 × 38 | 150 g (w/out batt.) | | CCD sensor, CF Type I card storage | |
| 2200 | Jan 28, 2004 | 2.0 MP; 1600×1200; 1/3.2" | 36–108 mm (3×) f/2.6–4.7 | 1.6"; 80,000 | 88 × 65 × 38 | 140 g (w/out batt.) | | Uses 2 AA batteries, CCD sensor, SD card storage | |
| 2500 | Jan 21, 2002 | 2.0 MP; 1600×1200; 1/2.7" | 37–111 mm (3×) f/2.7–4.8 | 1.5"; 110,000 | 114 × 59.5 × 31.5 | 165 g (w/out batt.) | | Swivel lens, CCD sensor, CF Type I card storage | |

=== Coolpix 3xxx ===
| Model | Release date | Sensor res., size | Lens (35 mm equiv.) zoom, aperture | Screen size, pixels | Dimensions W (mm) × H (mm) × D (mm) | Weight | Image | Features | Ref. |
| 3100 | Feb 18, 2003 | 3.2 MP; 2048×1536; 1/2.7" | 38–115 mm (3×) f/2.8–4.9 | 1.5"; 110,000 | 87.5 × 65 × 38 | 150 g (w/out batt.) | | CCD sensor, CF Type I card storage | |
| 3200 | Jan 28, 2004 | 3.2 MP; 2048×1536; 1/2.7" | 38–115 mm (3×) f/2.8–4.9 | 1.6"; 80,000 | 88 × 65 × 38 | 140 g (w/out batt.) | | Uses AA batteries, CCD sensor, SD card storage | |
| 3500 | Sep 19, 2002 | 3.2 MP; 2048×1536; 1/2.7" | 37–111 mm (3×) f/2.7–4.8 | 1.5"; 110,000 | 114 × 59.5 × 31.5 | 175 g (w/out batt.) | | Swivel lens, CCD sensor, CF Type I card storage | |
| 3700 | Dec 3, 2003 | 3.2 MP; 2048×1536; 1/2.7" | 35–105 mm (3×) f/2.8–4.9 | 1.5"; 134,000 | 95.5 × 50 × 31 | 130 g (w/out batt.) | | Aluminium body, CCD sensor, SD card storage | |

=== Coolpix 4xxx ===
| Model | Release date | Sensor res., size | Lens (35 mm equiv.) zoom, aperture | Screen size, pixels | Dimensions W (mm) × H (mm) × D (mm) | Weight | Image | Features | Ref. |
| 4100 | Jun 1, 2004 | 4.0 MP; 2288×1712; 1/2.7" | 35–105 mm (3×) f/2.8–4.9 | 1.6"; 80,000 | 88 × 65 × 38 | 140 g (w/out batt.) | | CCD sensor, SD card storage | |
| 4200 | Feb 12, 2004 | 4.0 MP; 2272×1704; 1/1.8" | 38–114 mm (3×) f/2.8–4.9 | 1.5"; 110,000 | 88 × 60 × 36.5 | 155 g (w/out batt.) | | CCD sensor, SD card storage | |
| 4300 | Sep 2, 2002 | 4.0 MP; 2272×1704; 1/1.8" | 38–105 mm (3×) f/2.8–4.9 | 1.5"; 110,000 | 95 × 69 × 52 | 230 g (w/out batt.) | | CCD sensor, CF card storage | |
| 4500 | May 29, 2002 | 4.0 MP; 2272×1704; 1/1.8" | 38–155 mm (4×) f/2.6–5.1 | 1.5"; 110,000 | 130 × 73 × 50 | 360 g (w/out batt.) | | CCD sensor, CF card storage | |
| 4600 | Feb 16, 2005 | 4.0 MP; 2288×1712; 1/2.5" | 34–102 mm (3×) f/2.9–4.9 | 1.8"; 80,000 | 85 × 60 × 35 | 130 g (w/out batt.) | | CCD sensor, SD card storage | |
| 4800 | Sep 16, 2004 | 4.0 MP; 2288×1712; 1/2.5" | 36–300 mm (8.3×) f/2.7–4.4 | 1.8"; 110,000 | 106 × 66 × 54 | 255 g (w/out batt.) | | best shot selector, SD card storage | |

=== Coolpix 5xxx ===
Note some cameras are numbered 5xxx on front, and E5xxx on bottom.

| Model | Release date | Sensor resolution, size, type | Lens (35 mm equiv) zoom, aperture | Digital Zoom | LCD screen size, pixels | Image | Features | Ref. |
|---|---|---|---|---|---|---|---|---|
| Coolpix 5000 | Sept 2001 | 4.9 MP; 2560×1920; 2/3" CCD | 38–85 mm (3×); F2.8-F4.8 | 4× | 1.8"; 110,000 | | | |
| Coolpix 5100 | | 5.0 MP; CCD | 3× | 4× | 1.6" | | | |
| Coolpix 5200 | Feb 2004 | 5.0 MP; 2592×1944; 1/1.8" CCD | 38–114 mm (3×); F2.8-F4.9 | 4× | 1.5"; 110,000 | | | |
| Coolpix 5400 | May 2003 | 5.0 MP; 2592×1944; 1/1.8" CCD | 28–116 mm (4.1×); F2.8-F4.6 | 4× | 1.5"; 134,000 | | | |
| Coolpix 5600 | Feb 2005 | 5.0 MP; 2592×1944; 1/2.5" CCD | 34–102 mm (3×); F2.8-F4.9 | 4× | 1.8"; 80,000 | | Movie recording with audio at 15 frame/s in QuickTime .MOV format. | |
| Coolpix 5700 | May 2002 | 4.9 MP; 2560×1940; 2/3" CCD | 35–280 mm (8×); F2.8-F4.2 | 4× | 1.5"; 110,000 | | | |
| Coolpix 5900 | Feb 2005 | 5.0 MP; 2592×1944; 1/1.8" CCD | 38–114 mm (3×); F2.8-F4.9 | 4× | 2"; 115,000 | | | |

=== Coolpix 7xxx ===
| Model | Release date | Sensor resolution, size, type | Lens (35 mm equiv) zoom, aperture | Digital Zoom | LCD screen size, pixels | Image | Features | Ref. |
|---|---|---|---|---|---|---|---|---|
| Coolpix 7600 | Feb 2005 | 7.1 MP; 3702×2304; 1/1.8" CCD | 38–114 mm (3×); F2.8-F4.8 | 4× | 1.8"; 85,000 | | | |
| Coolpix 7900 | Feb 2005 | 7.1 MP; 3702×2304; 1/1.8" CCD | 38–114 mm (3×); F2.8-F4.8 | 4× | 2"; 115,000 | | | |

=== Coolpix 8xxx ===
| Model | Release date | Sensor resolution, size, type | Lens (35 mm equiv) zoom, aperture | Digital Zoom | LCD screen size, pixels | Image | Features | Ref. |
|---|---|---|---|---|---|---|---|---|
| Coolpix 8400 | September 2004 | 8.0 MP; 3264×2248; 2/3" CCD | 24–85 mm (3.5×); F2.8-F8.0 | 4× | 1.8"; 134,000 | | | |
| Coolpix 8700 | January 2004 | 8.0 MP; 3264×2248; 2/3" CCD | 35–280 mm (8×); F2.8-F8.0 | 4× | 1.8"; 134,000 | | | |
| Coolpix 8800 | September 2004 | 8.0 MP; 3264×2248; 2/3" CCD | 35–350 mm (10×); F2.8-F5.0 | 4× | 1.8"; 134,000 | | VR (Vibration Reduction) | |

== Raw image format ==
The following discontinued Coolpix cameras support raw image files:

- 5000 — NEF format
- 8700 — NEF format (with firmware upgrade)
- P6000 — NRW format
- P7000 — NRW format
- P7100 — NRW format

Some Coolpix cameras which are not advertised as supporting a raw file format can produce usable raw files if switched to a maintenance mode. Note that switching to this mode can invalidate a camera's guarantee. Nikon models with this capability: E700, E800, E880, E900, E950, E990, E995, E2100, E2500, E3700, E4300, E4500.
