= Nikon Coolpix S600 =

Digital camera model

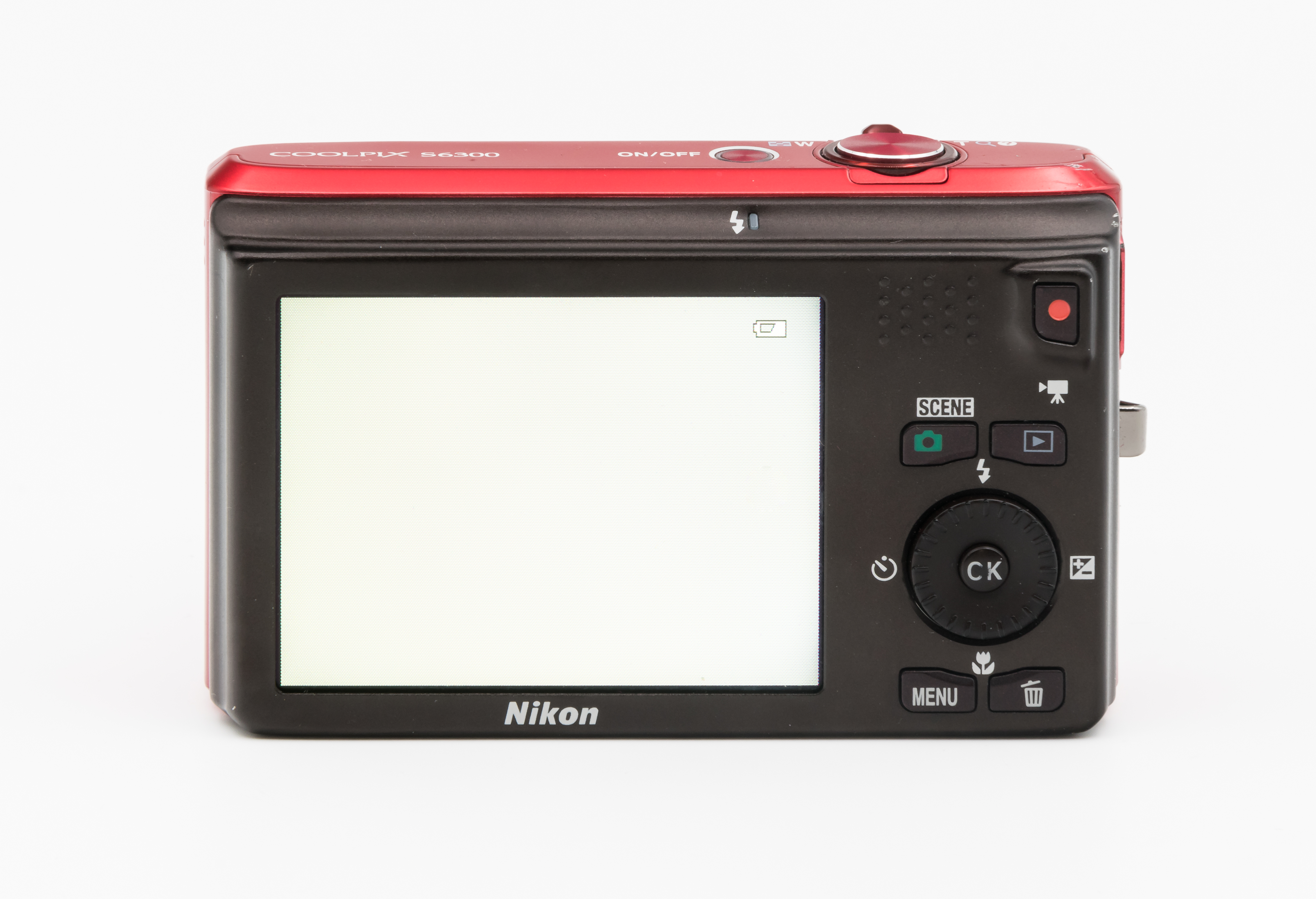
Nikon COOLPIX S600

Nikon COOLPIX S600 is a small digital camera by Nikon. It is a point-and-shoot camera with a resolution of 10 Megapixels, and 4x optical zoom. The S600 was released in the spring of 2008 along with other digital point-and-shoot, and DSLR cameras. The newest model of this series is the S640.
