= Film scanner =

Device for scanning photographic film

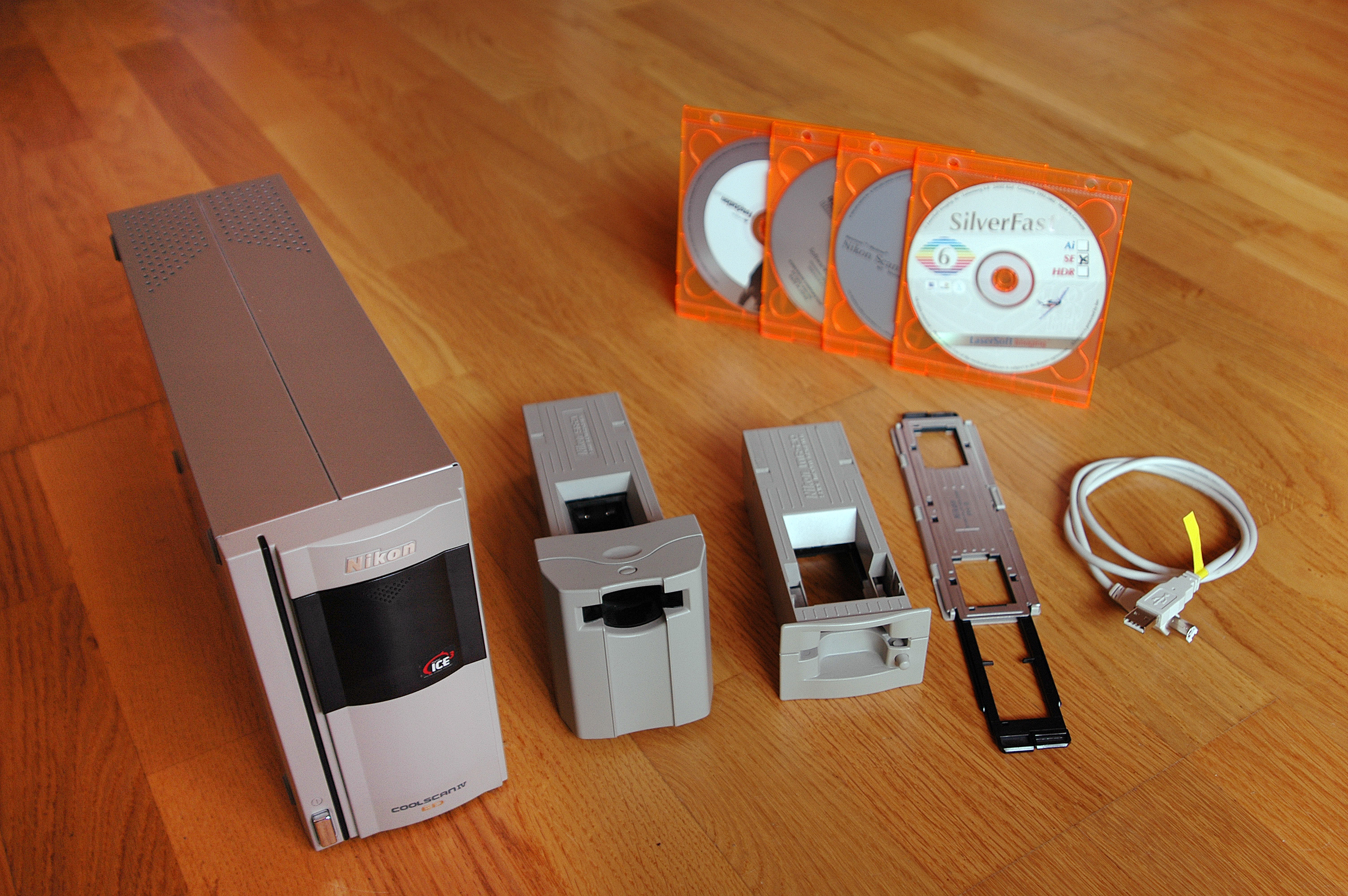
- Nikon Coolscan IV ED, a film scanner designed to accept 35mm slides and negatives directly, with film handling accessories, cables, and bundled software
- Industry: Film and digital photography
- Examples: Canon CanoScan FS; Minolta Dimage Scan; Nikon Coolscan and Super Coolscan; Plustek OpticFilm; Reflecta CrystalScan, RPS, and xScan

A film scanner, also called a slide scanner or transparency scanner, is a device used by individuals to scan photographic film into a personal computer. Unlike a flatbed scanner, which generally requires an intermediate step of printing the image from the exposed film onto paper, a film scanner provides several benefits: the photographer has direct control over cropping and aspect ratio from the original, unmolested image on film; and many film scanners have special software or hardware that removes scratches and film grain and improves color reproduction from film.

Drum scanners typically provide scanned files for high-end applications with resolution and sharpness superior to film scanners. However, drum scanners also are more expensive and laborious to use in comparison, so their market is limited to professional film scanning services instead of individual amateur and professional photographers.

== Typical design ==
Selected film scanners

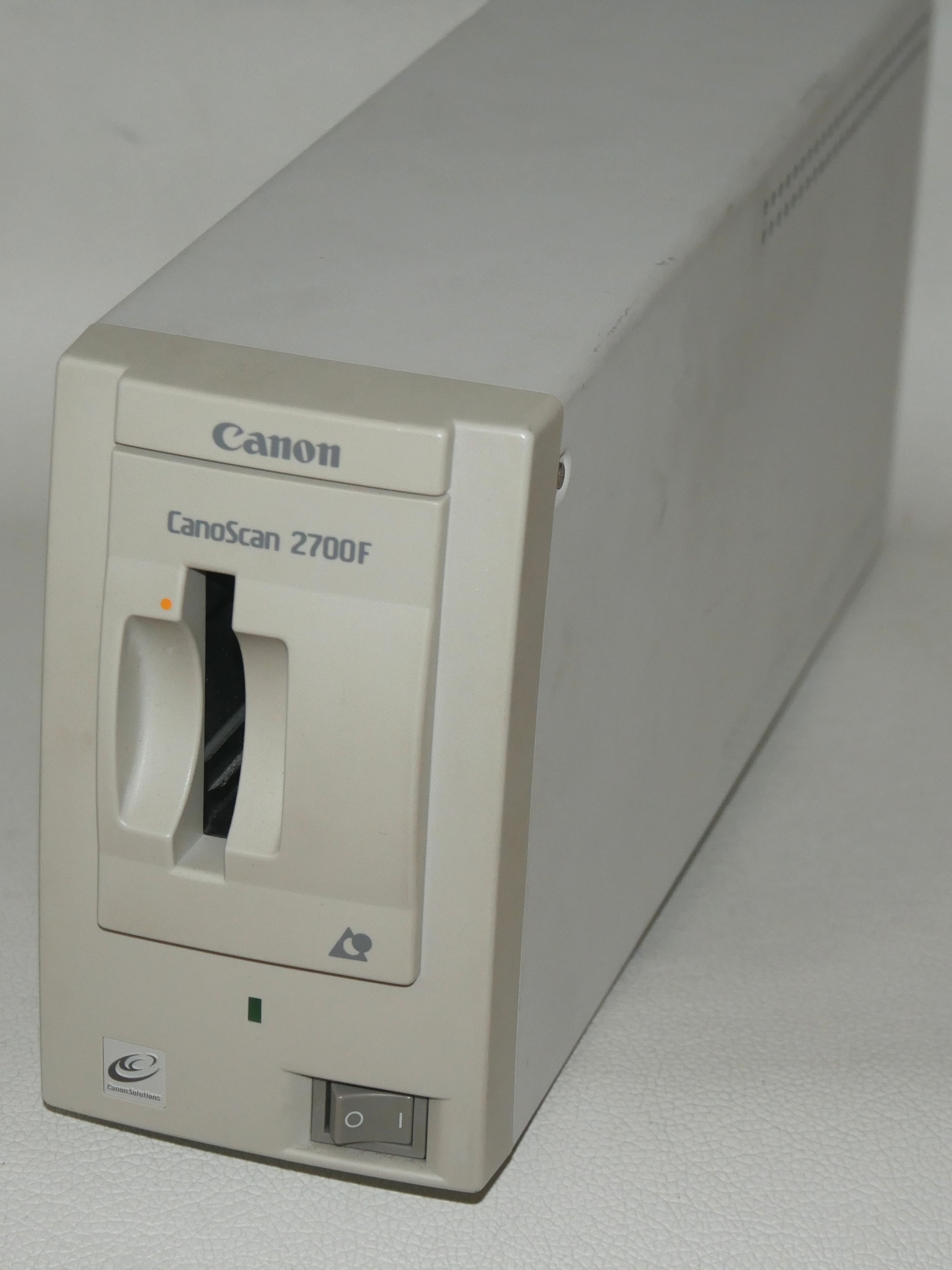
Canon CanoScan 2700F for APS film

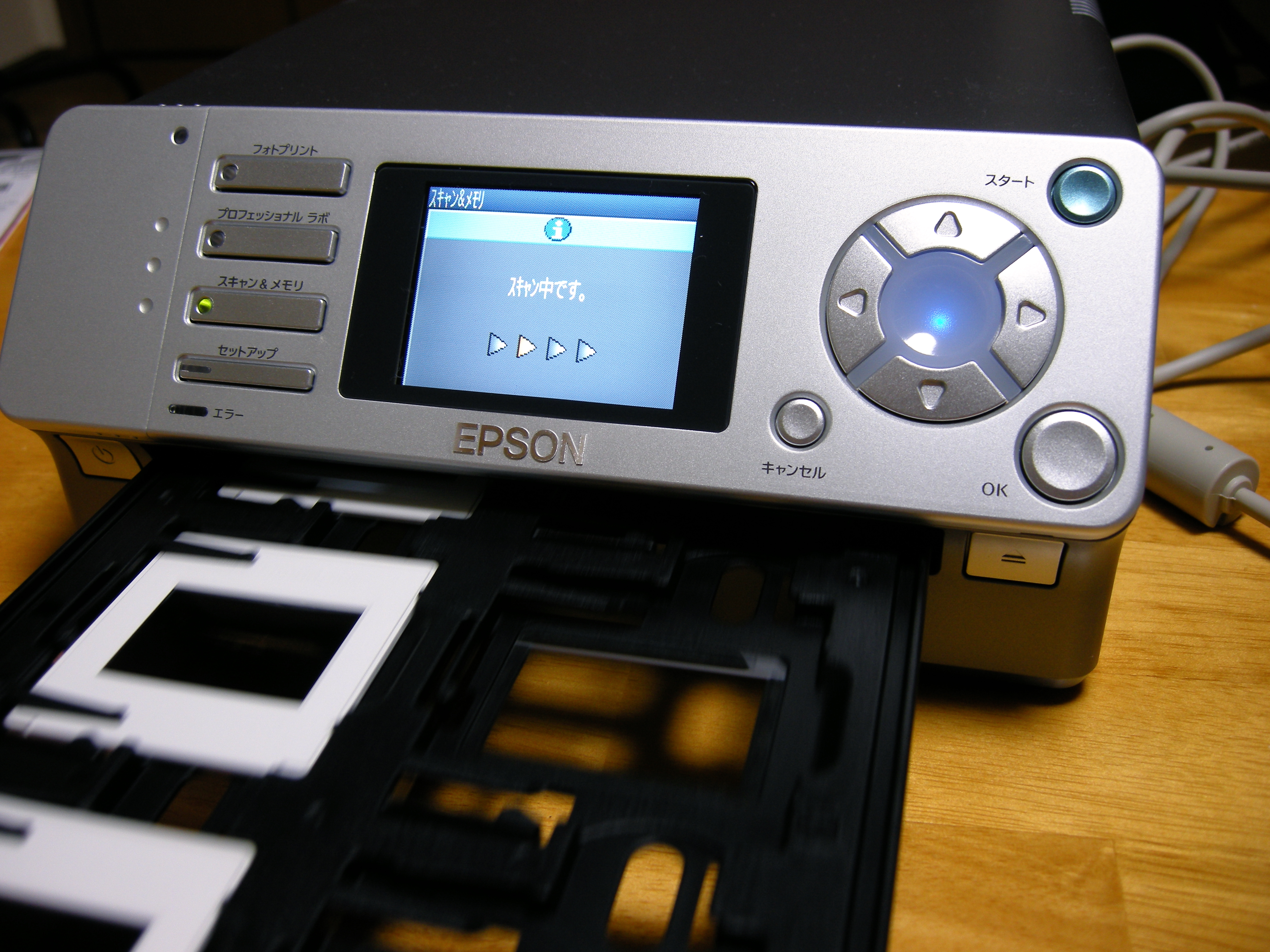
Epson F-3200

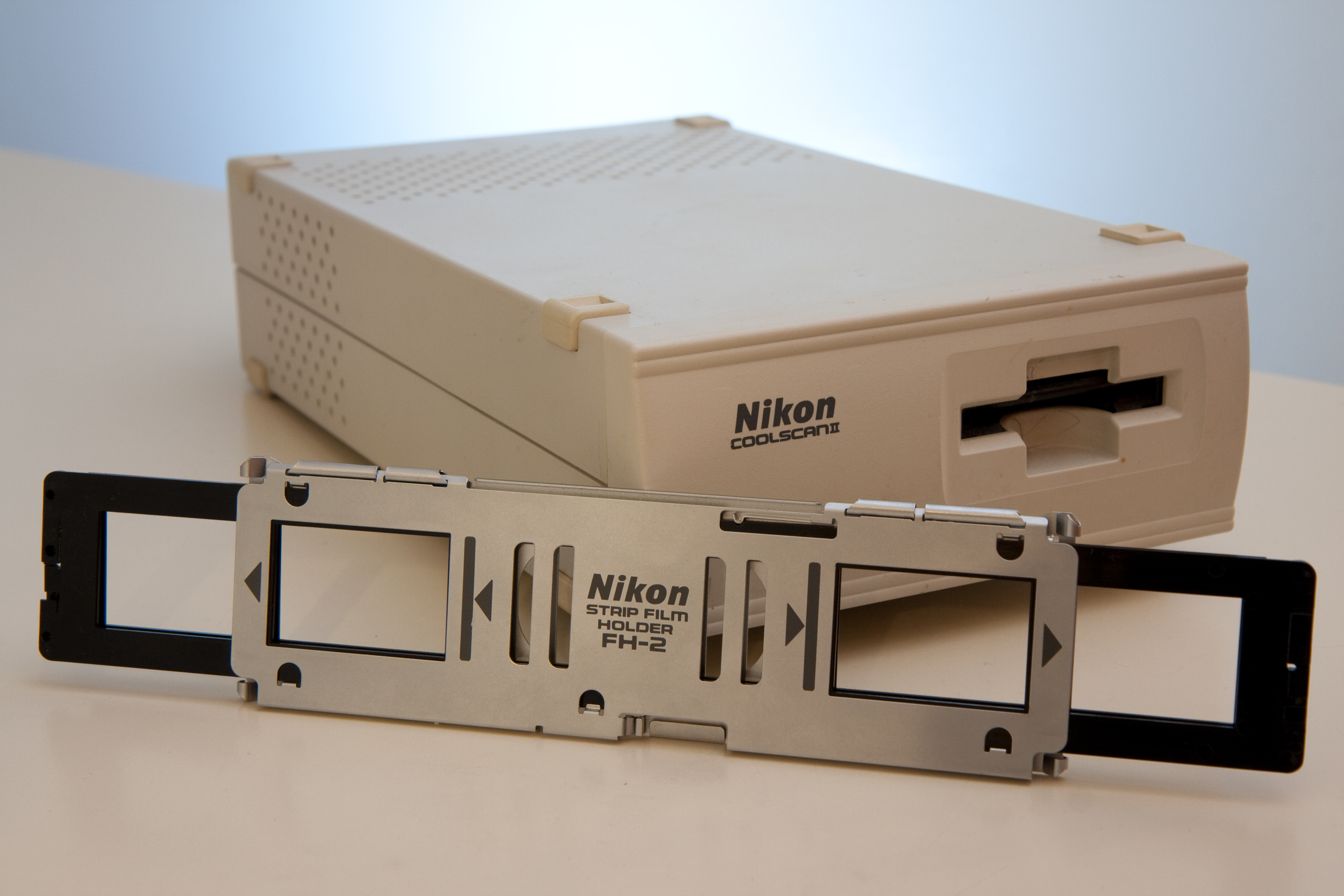
Nikon Coolscan II with adapter for film strips

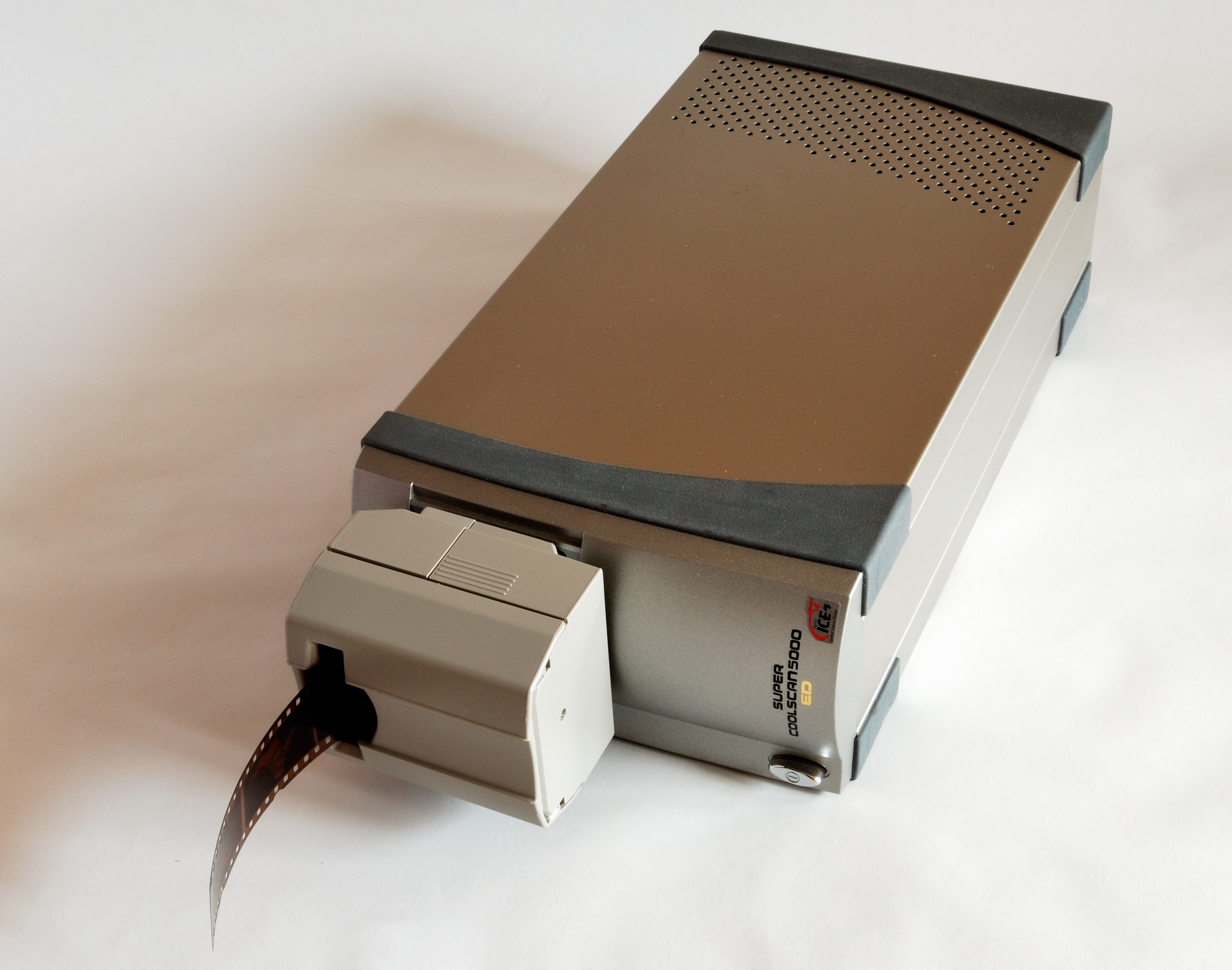
Nikon Super Coolscan 5000 ED with cut film strip feeder

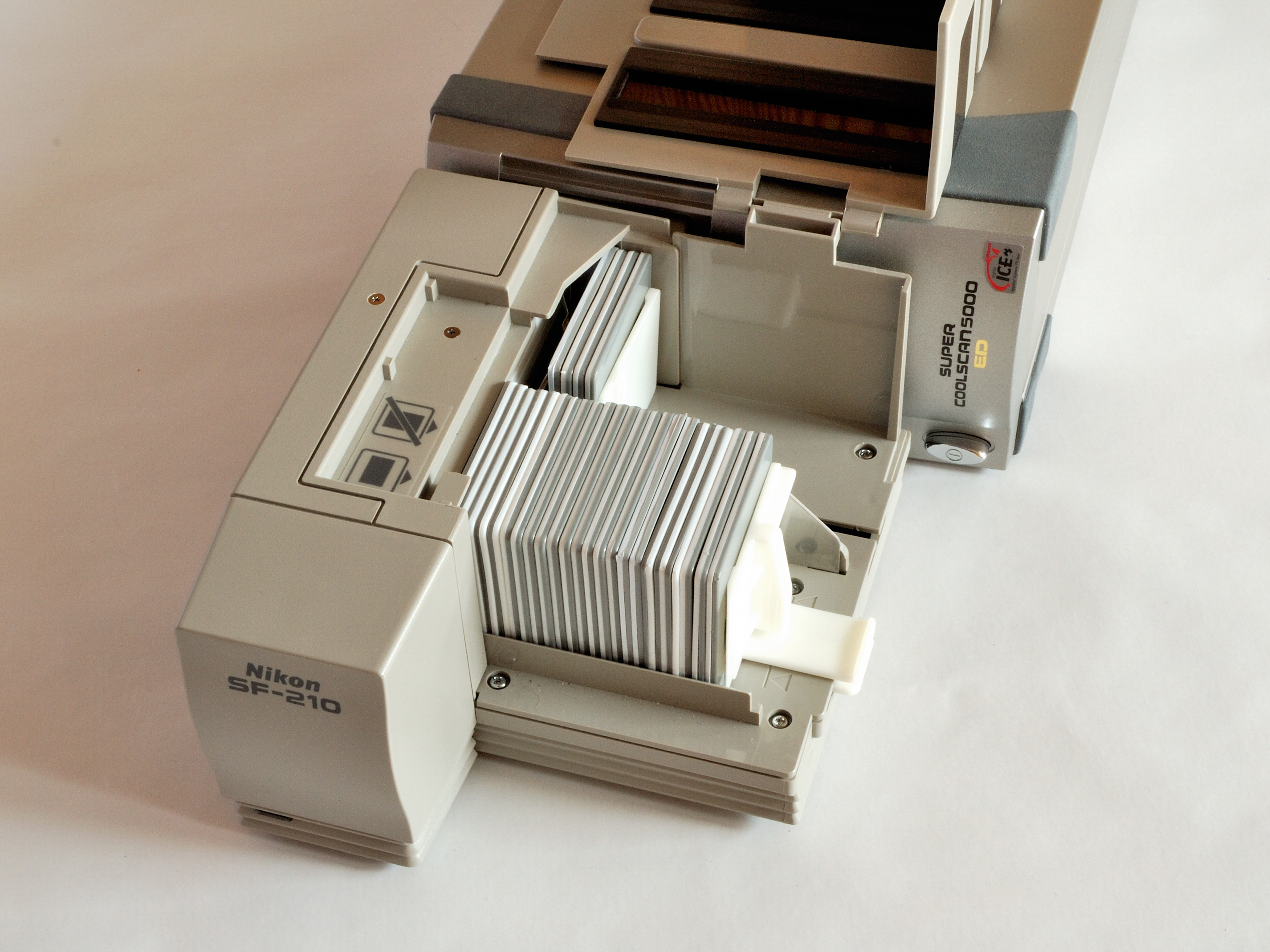
Nikon Super Coolscan 5000 ED with automated slide feeder

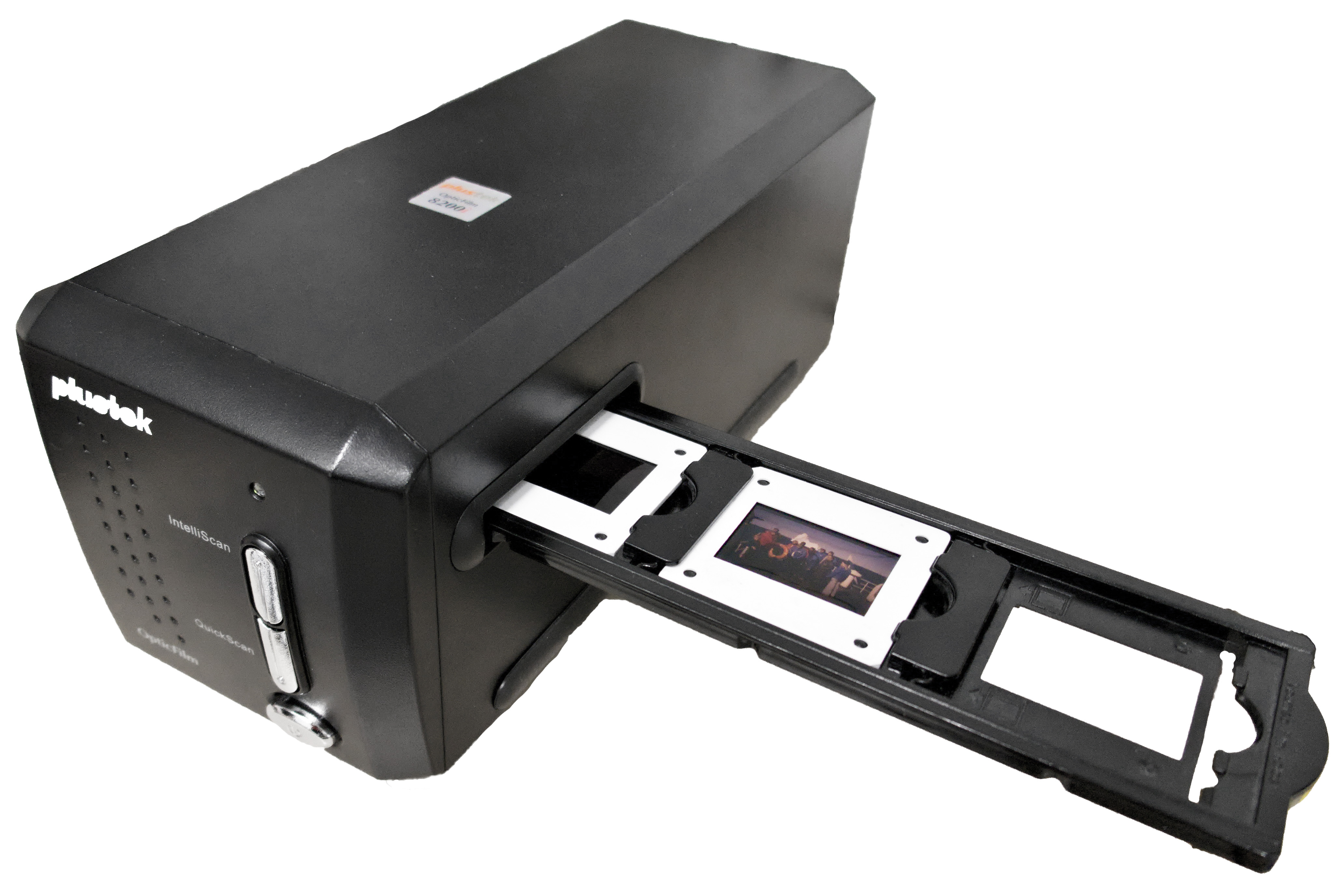
Plustek OpticFilm 8200 with slide tray

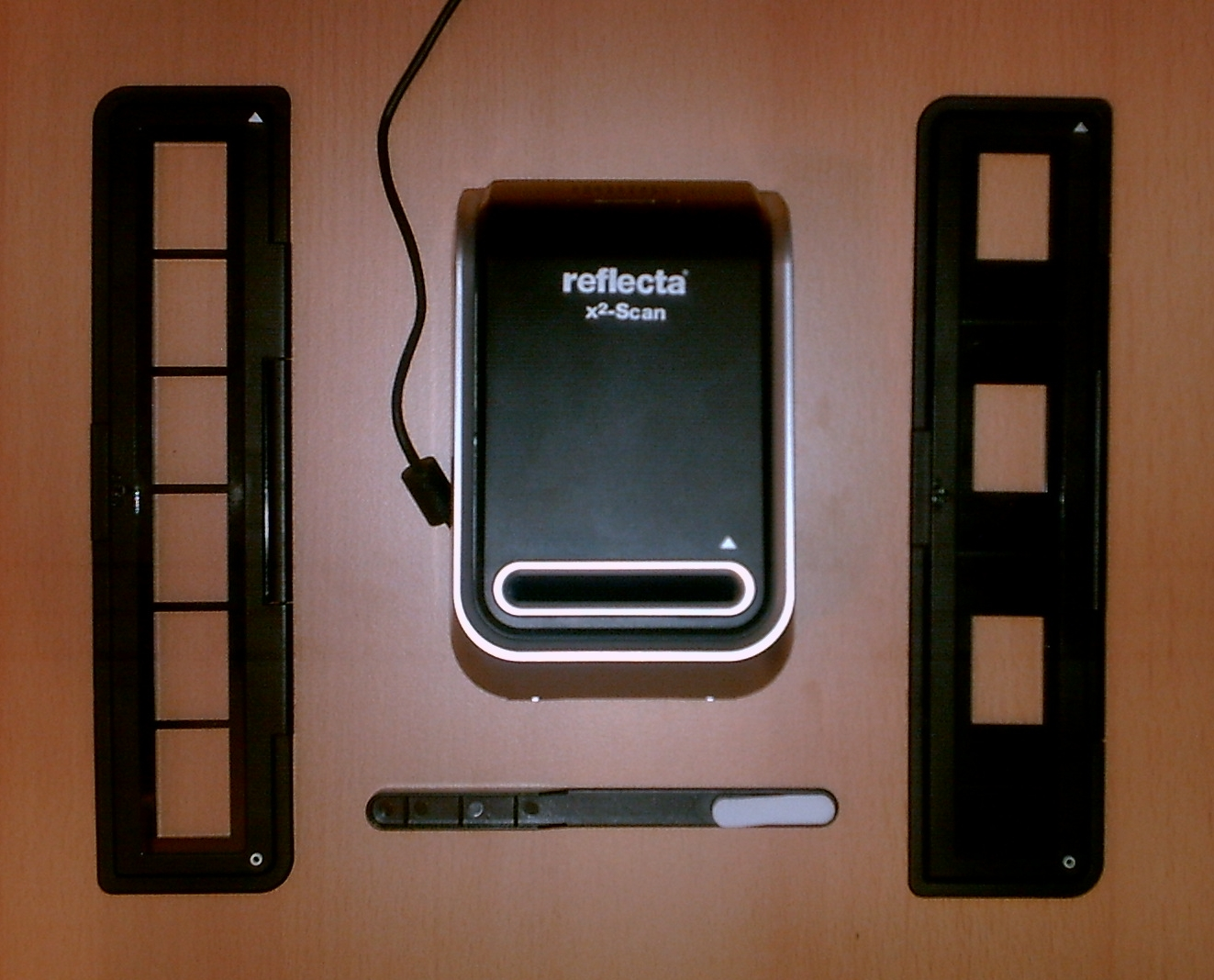
Reflecta x^{2}-Scan with accessories

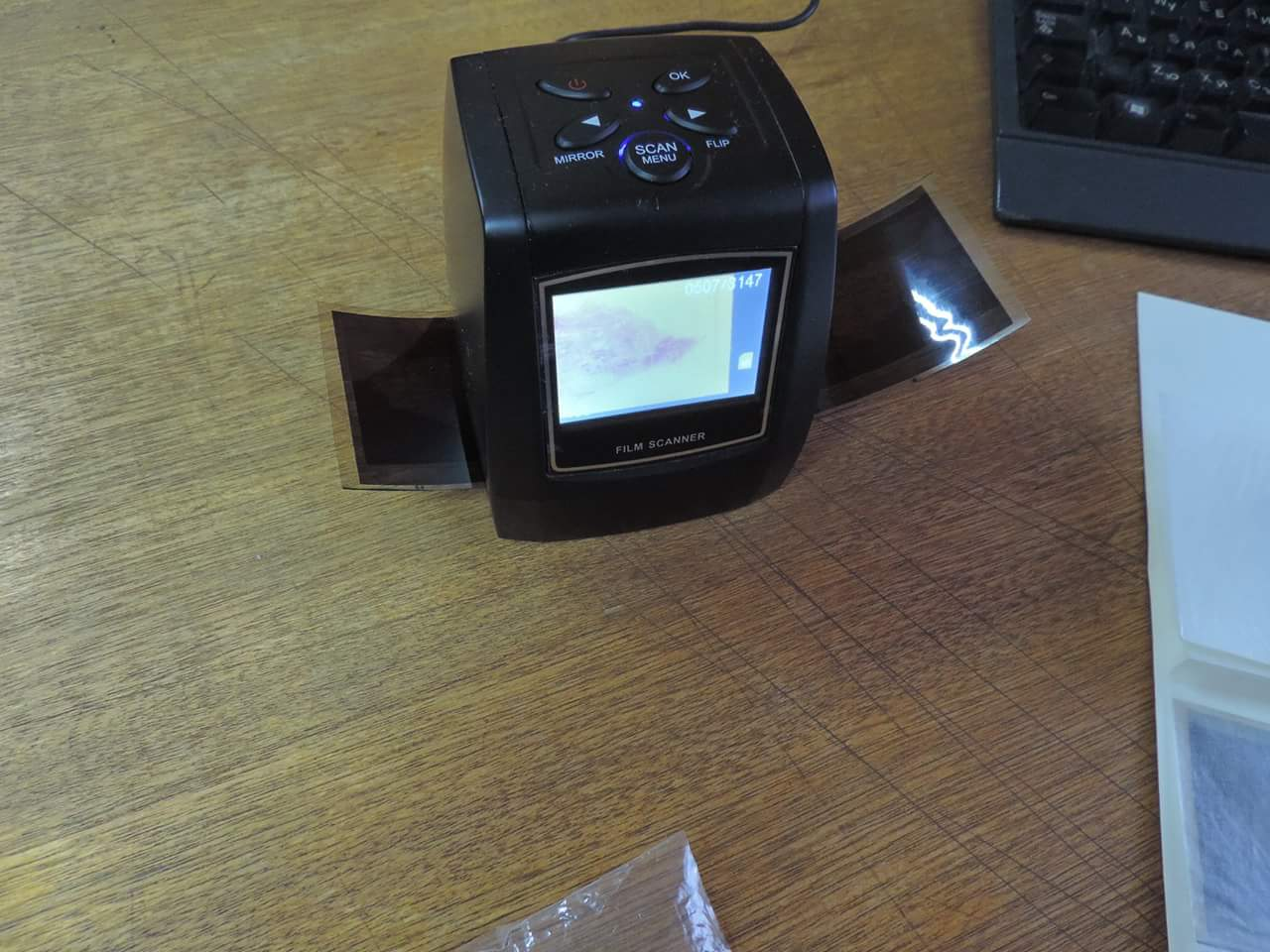
BASA scanner

=== Film handling ===
Film scanners are designed to accept either strips of 35 mm or 120 film, or individual slides directly, and typically are equipped with mechanical devices to hold the film during scanning.

Low-end film scanners typically only take 35mm film strips and slides, while medium- and high-end film scanners usually offer several interchangeable mechanical film handling modules. This allows the same scanner platform to be used for different sizes and types of film. For example, the Nikon Coolscan III includes both the MA-20 module, which is designed to handle single 35mm slides, and the SA-20 module for cut 35mm film strips. These modules are used one at a time, or they could be supplemented with additional accessories and modules, including:

- IA-20 for Advanced Photo System cartridges
- FH-3 (35mm cut film strip holder with MA-20)

Later scanners offered by Nikon were bundled with updated slide and filmstrip modules (MA-21 and SA-21) and were compatible with more modules for 35mm film, including:

- FH-G1 (glass microscope slide holder with MA-21)
- SA-30 (roll film adapter)
- SF-200 & SF-210 (automated slide feeder)

The Nikon Super Coolscan 8000 ED and 9000 ED offered a wide variety of film holders, rather than mechanical modules, to accommodate different film formats, including 120/220:

- FH-835S (35mm strip film)
- FH-835M (35mm mounted slides)
- FH-869S (120/220 strip film)
- FH-869M (120/220 mounted slides)
- FH-869G (120/220 strip film with glass platen)
- FH-869GR (120/220 mounted slides with glass platen)
- FH-816 (16mm film)
- FH-8G1 (Medical slides)

=== Scan resolution and contrast ===
Inside the device, the film is scanned by illuminating the film with a LED or fluorescent light source and passing a linear CCD over the film at a precise rate, resulting in a resolution of approximately 2000 to 4000 dots per inch (DPI). The density of the linear sensor array dictates the scanner resolution in one dimension, while the rate at which the sensor is moved across the film dictates the other dimension. For color scans, the scanner can swap filters on the light source to provide scans with three color channels after making three passes with the scanning sensor. In some scanners, a multi-line linear CCD is used so that all three colors (red, blue, and green) can be scanned in one pass.

Some recent and lower-end film scanners use two-dimensional image sensors, similar to those available for smartphones and digital cameras, to digitize film; in these cases, the scanned resolution is stated in megapixels (MP) rather than DPI, and the scanner is essentially a digital camera with specialized firmware and hardware to handle exposed slides and negative film.

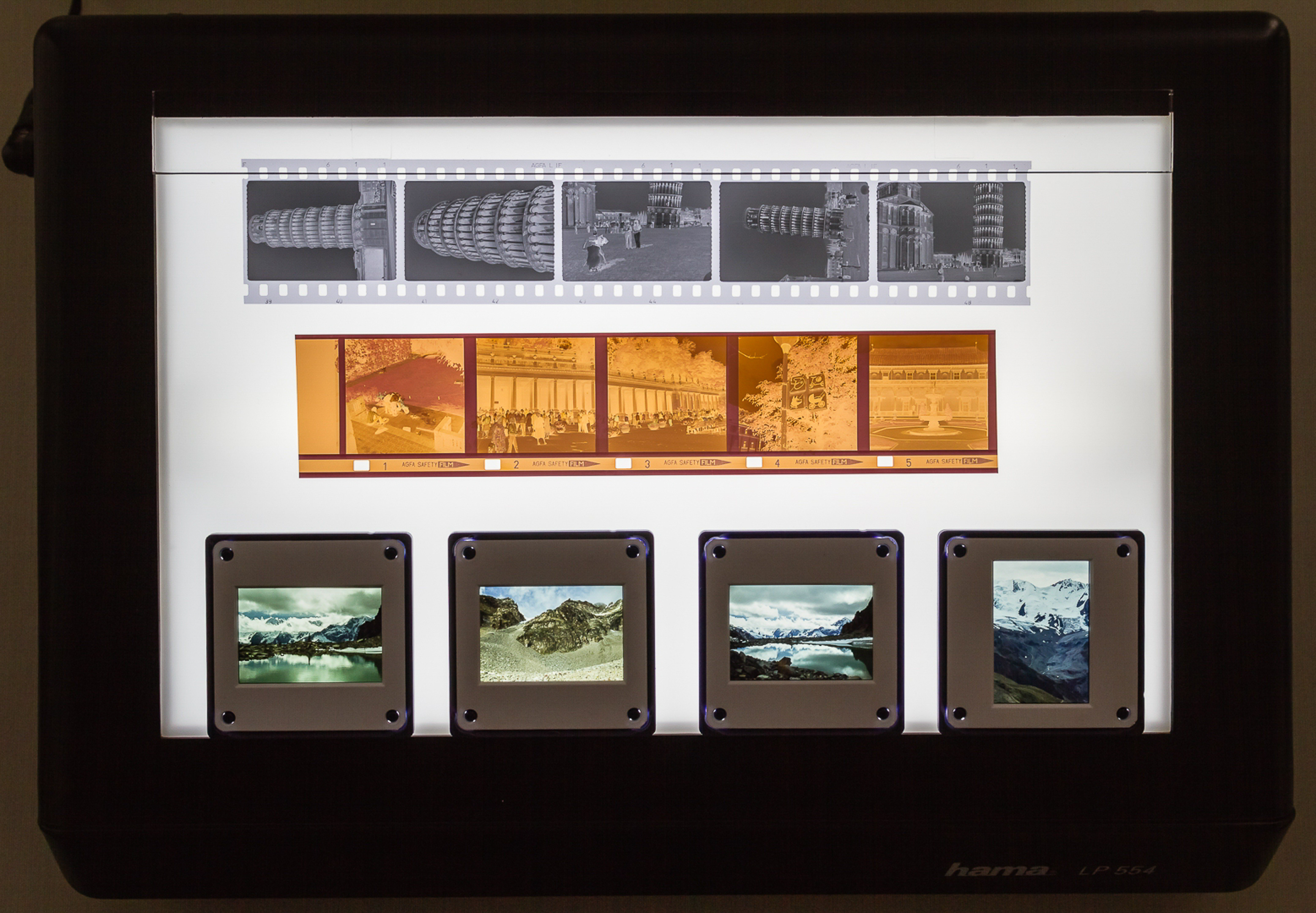
Monochrome (top), color negative (middle), and color reversal films show differences in density

The density of a particular section of film is defined as $D \equiv \log_{10} \frac{1}{T}$, where T is the ratio of incident light and the amount of light transmitted. The contrast ratio of scanned files is characterized by the difference between the minimum and maximum density that can be distinguished by the scanner, $D_{min}$ and $D_{max}$. For film, the maximum density is the most opaque value which can be recorded on the film, and likewise, the minimum density is the least opaque value which can recorded. A perfect $D_{min}$ is 0.0, meaning that all the incident light is transmitted through the film. For a scanner, this means $D_{max}$ is the most opaque value that can be distinguished from pure black (completely opaque), while $D_{min}$ is the least opaque value that can be distinguished from a completely transparent section of the film. For convenience, define the difference between minimum and maximum density as $\Delta D \equiv D_{max} - D_{min}$. The relationships between density, contrast ratio, and dynamic range can be written as:

- Contrast Ratio = $10^{\Delta D}:1$
- Dynamic Range (stops) = $\log_{2} 10^{\Delta D} = \Delta D \cdot \log_{2} 10 = 3.322 \cdot \Delta D$

Film base has an inherent density due to the material and the development of some grains, which limits $D_{min}$ to approximately 0.1. A well-exposed slide (reversal film) has a $\Delta D$ of 3.4, while color negatives have a lower $\Delta D$ of 2.8, since the orange film base dye increases the $D_{min}$. Dynamic range is further reduced with a photographic print, which is limited to a $\Delta D$ of 2.0. Steinhoff suggests that for scanning negatives, a $\Delta D$ of 3.0 is adequate, while slides should be scanned with a film scanner with $\Delta D > 3.6$.

Most scanners only specify the $D_{max}$ as human perception is better able to distinguish shadows compared to highlights. For example, the Nikon Super Coolscan 8000 ED claims to have $D_{max}=4.2$. This means the scanner is able to distinguish black tones as deep as 1/10^{4.2}, which is a section of film that transmits just 0.0063% of the incoming light. Due to this inherent density, $\Delta D=4.2-0.1=4.1$, giving the scan a contrast ratio of 10^{4.1}:1 = 12590:1, which is equivalent to a dynamic range of 13.62 stops. The Super Coolscan 5000 ED and 9000 ED both claim to have $D_{max}=4.8$ which gives a $\Delta D=4.7$, translating to a contrast ratio of 50120:1 or a dynamic range of 15.61 stops.

=== Interfaces ===
Film scanners were built with a variety of interfaces for personal computers, including SCSI, FireWire, and USB.

=== Alternatives ===
Canon CanoScan 8800F

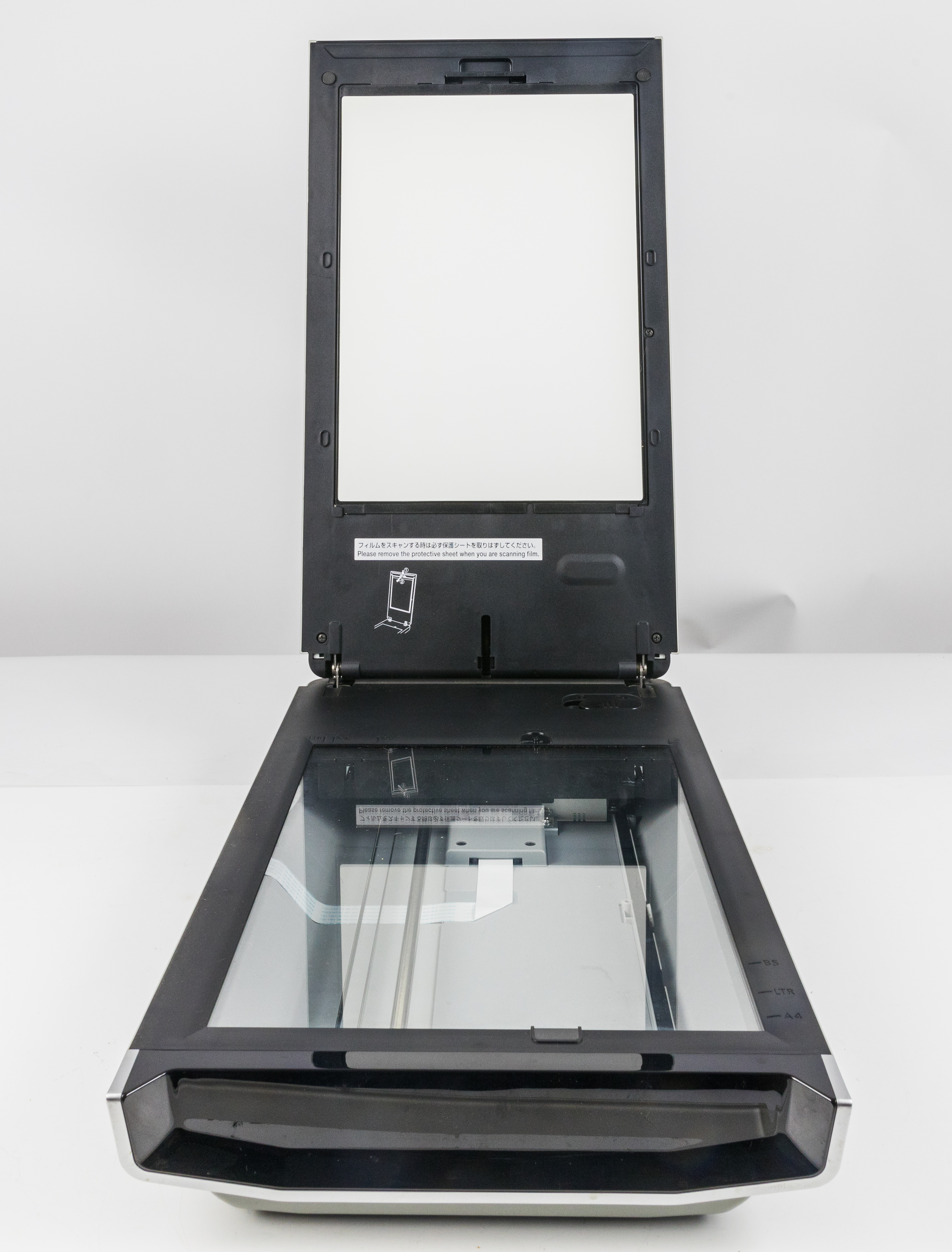
Lid open, document mode

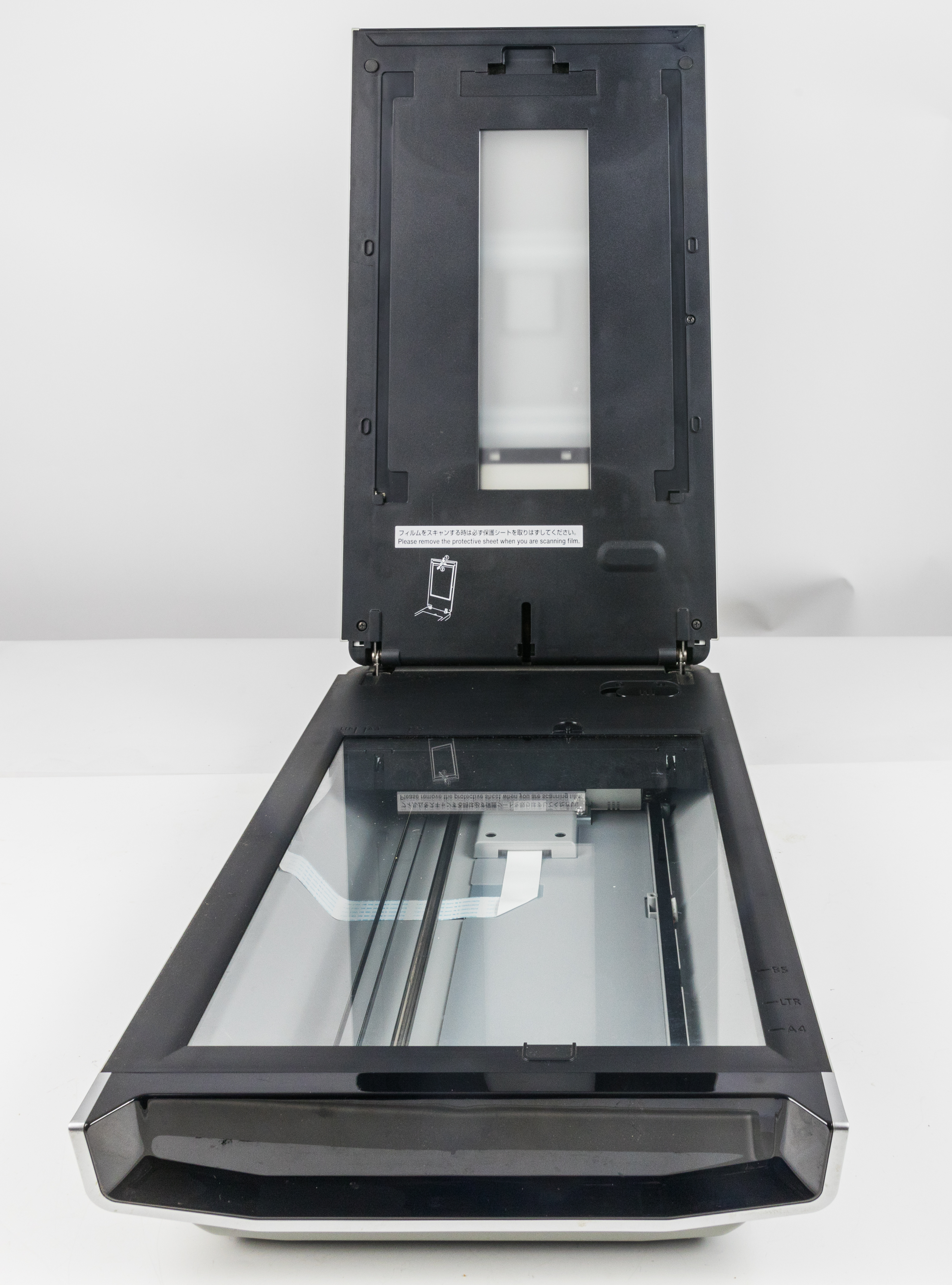
Lid open, film mode

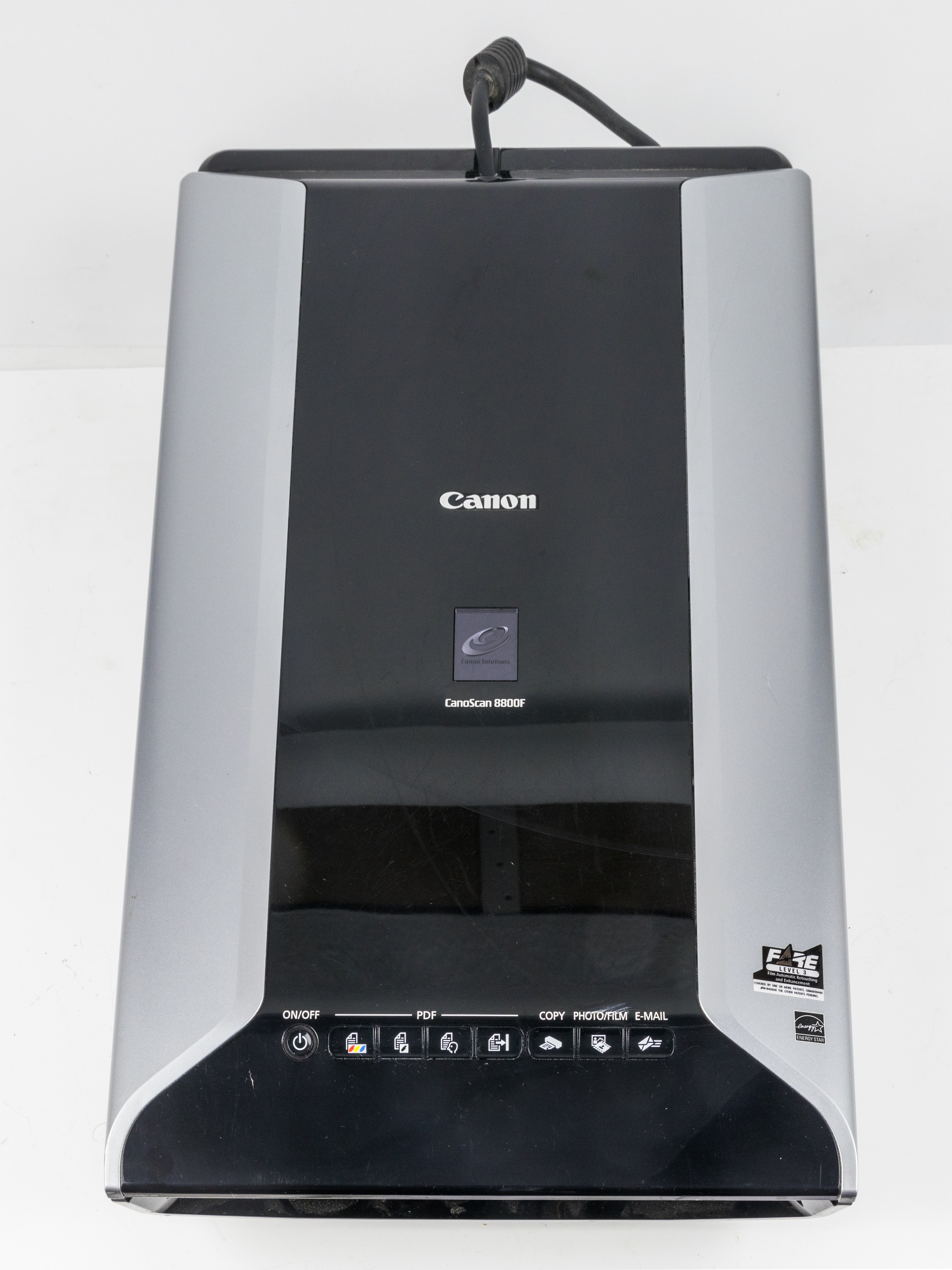
Lid closed

This is a flatbed scanner that can scan documents or film

Flatbed scanners typically have a glass platen on which a document or picture is placed, face-down, to be scanned; the inside of the lid is lined with a flexible, opaque white surface backed with foam to press the original flat against the platen while accommodating minor surface irregularities. Some flatbed scanners are equipped with a special lid to facilitate film scanning; for these scanners, the opaque white surface lining the lid can be removed, exposing another glass surface with a built-in backlight to illuminate the slide or negative filmstrip during scanning. These dual-purpose flatbed scanners can be distinguished by a significantly bulkier lid with an electrical connection to the scanner unit, since an additional light source is fitted to the lid.

In general, the resolution and contrast ratio of dual purpose flatbeds is lower than that achieved by film scanners. For example, the Epson V850 flatbed has a claimed $D_{max}=4.0$, which gives a contrast ratio of 10000:1 or a dynamic range of 13.3 stops. Tests of scanners with a claimed resolution of 4800 DPI have shown they only resolve 1700 DPI; an earlier Epson scanner, the V700, has an effective resolution of 1920×1770 DPI and a $D_{max}$ of 3.4.

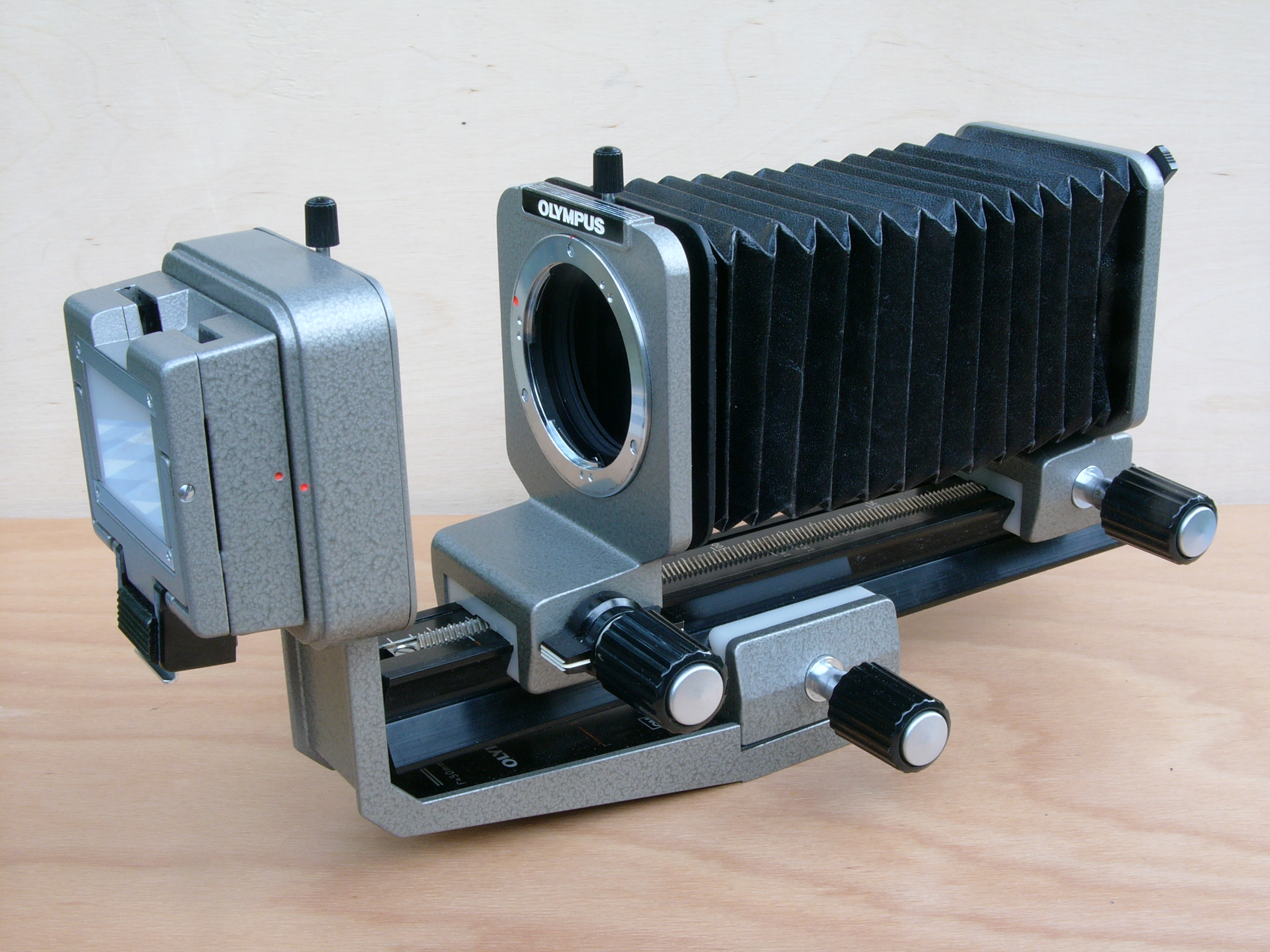
Olympus bellows unit with slide copying attachment

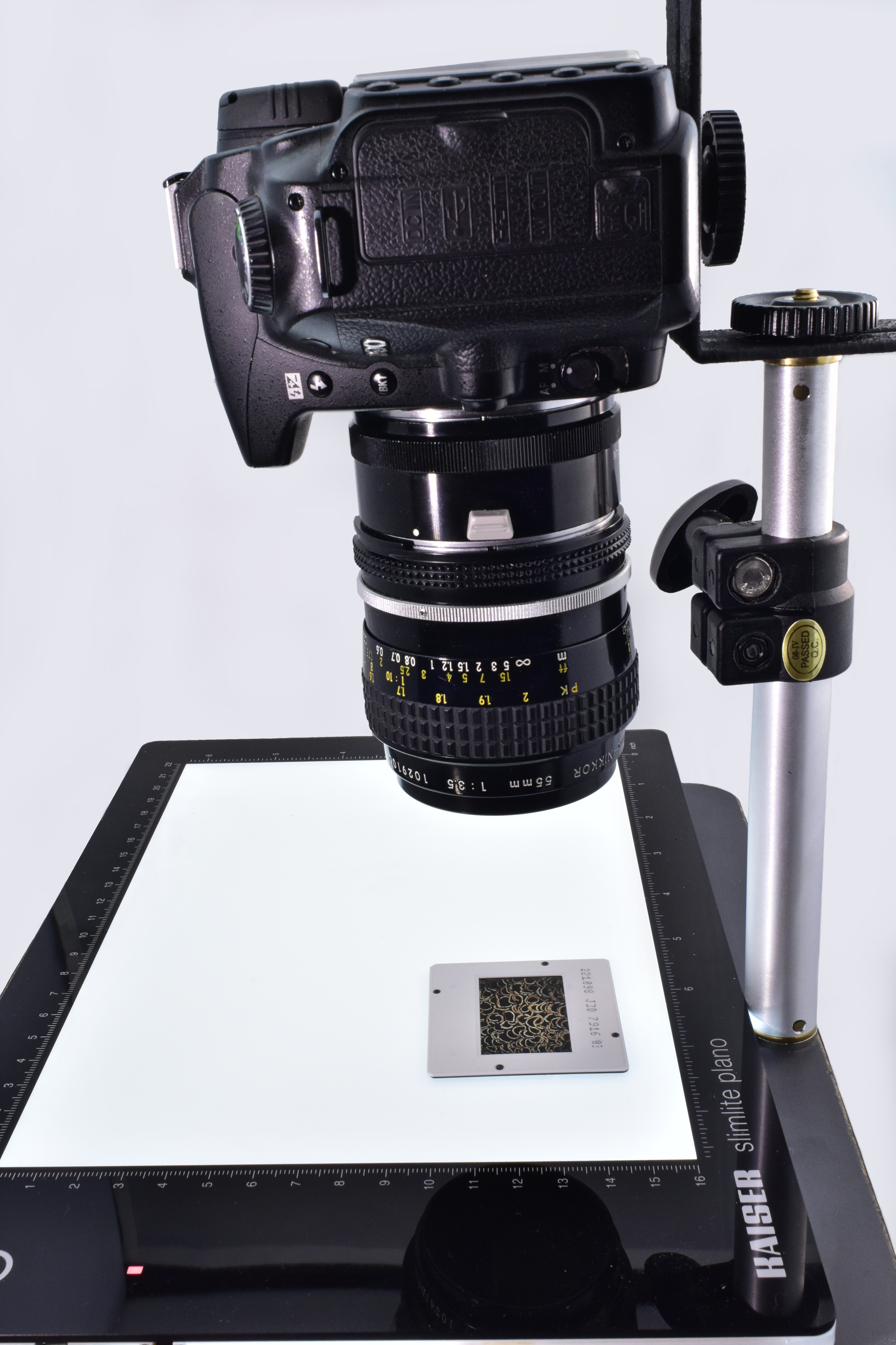
Digital camera with Micro-Nikkor lens, copying stand, and lightbox

Slide copying attachments are used with bellows extension attachments for close-up photography. A suitable bellows, lens, and slide copying attachment produced during the era of film photography can be added to a digital interchangeable lens camera to scan slides. The light source to illuminate the film can vary from a bright cloudy sky to a diffused speedlight.

Alternatively, a macro lens can be used along with specialized accessories, or an appropriate backlight and supports to ensure the camera's sensor is held parallel to the film's surface. Results can vary; in some cases, a dual-purpose flatbed may give a superior scan.

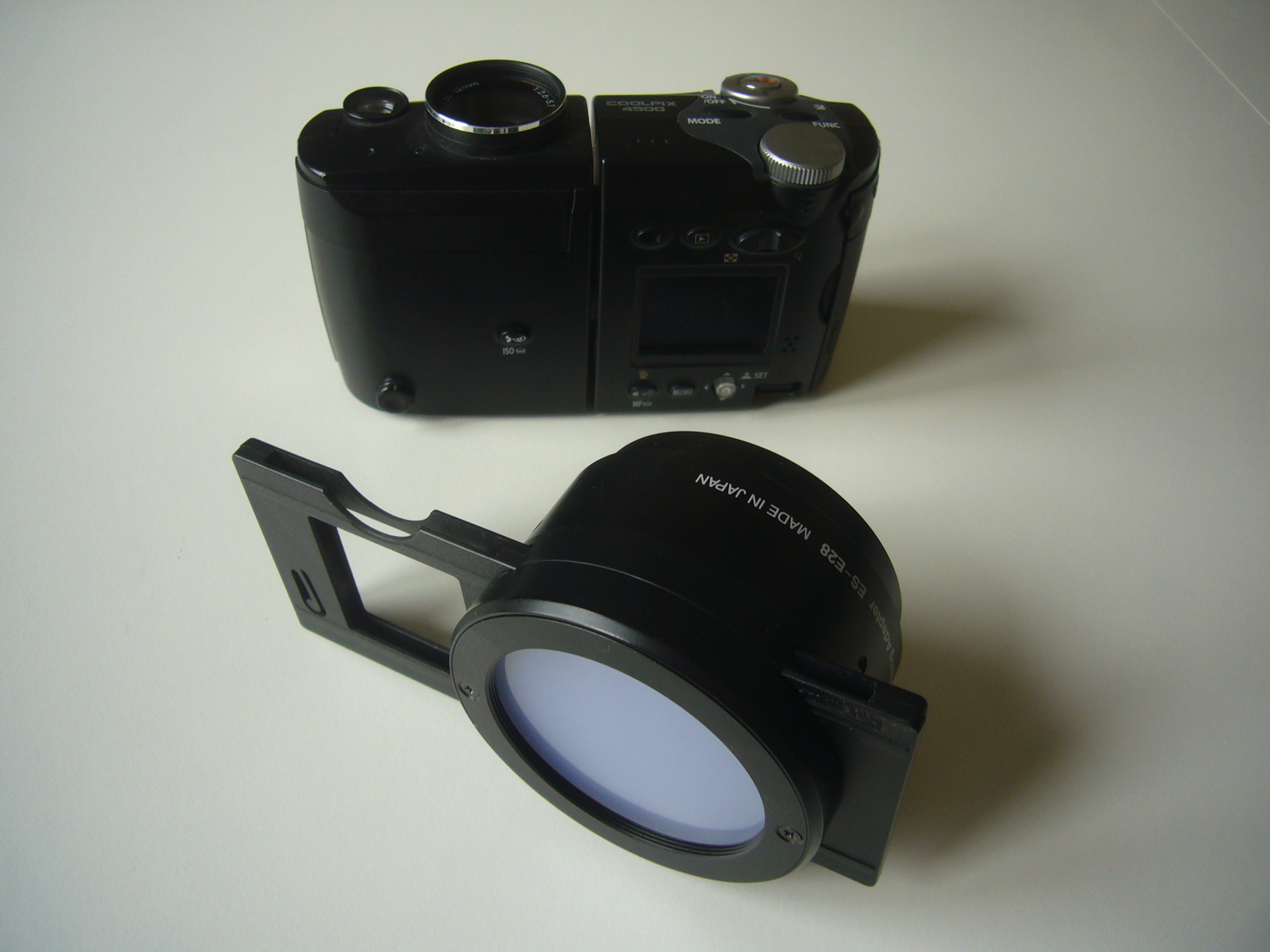
Nikon Coolpix 4500 with ES-E28

For digital cameras with fixed lenses, some manufacturers have produced dedicated slide / negative copying accessories. For example, the Nikon ES-E28 can be attached to specific Coolpix digital cameras to scan film. Some of these cameras (including the Coolpix 995, 4500, and 5000) have a special "invert colors" mode to facilitate scanning film negatives. The primary advantage of these slide-copying techniques is speed.

For a time, Kodak offered film processing with scans at a resolution of 1536×1024 ("Picture CD"), 3072×2048 ("Photo CD"), or 6144×4096 ("Pro Photo CD"); Fujifilm offered a competing Fujicolor CD product with APS film processing with resolution similar to Picture CD. The files were saved in JPEG format, with limited capability for edits.

== History ==
Some of the earliest affordable scanners were available in 1993, including the Nikon Coolscan (LS-10), with a suggested retail price of US$2,495 (equivalent to $5,600 in 2025), and the Santos mira·35, US$2,695 (equivalent to $6,000 in 2025). Compared to a typical contemporary flatbed scanner (600 DPI), these offered significantly greater scanning resolutions of 2700 DPI; neither of these film scanners was intended for high-volume work, and the resulting scans were judged inferior to a PhotoCD scanned by the photofinisher during development.

By 2005, due to the falling prices of digital SLRs, increasingly acceptable results from flatbed scanners, and stagnation in resolution and density specifications, the market for film scanners had shrunk considerably. The advent of affordable digital cameras with 24 megapixel sensors meant that an all-digital workflow could exceed the capabilities of scanned 35 mm film. Consider a state-of-the-art scanner from the early 2000s (Nikon Super Coolscan 8000 ED) and compare it with a digital camera from 2011, the Sony SLT-A77, one of the first cameras with a 24 MP APS-C sensor. At 4000 DPI, a typical 35mm film frame which measures 24×36 mm (0.94×1.42 in) can be scanned to a file with an equivalent resolution of 21.4 MP. The SLT-A77 could capture the same scene with a higher resolution, or the same camera can be used with a suitable macro lens to directly digitize the slide or negative film, again with superior resolution. The dynamic range of the SLT-A77 is rated at 13.2 stops, which is equivalent to a $\Delta D$ of 3.97, which is comparable to that of the Super Coolscan 8000 ED (4.1).

Although film scanners with even higher resolutions are available, up to approximately 7200 DPI, this requires a very fine-grained film as the source material, and 2900 DPI has been suggested as a realistic value sufficient for most film images.

== Post-processing ==
Some software used to process images scanned by film scanners allows for automatic color correction based on the film manufacturer and type. In many cases the source film may not be marked with this information in human-readable form, but might be marked at the bottom edge with a DX film edge barcode following a standard maintained by ANSI and I3A.

=== Dust and scratch removal ===
Dust and scratches on the film can be a big problem for scanning. Because of their reduced size (compared to prints), the scanners are capable of resolutions much higher than a regular flatbed scanner; typically at least 2000 samples per inch (spi), up to 4000 spi or more. At these resolutions dust and scratches take on gigantic proportions. Even small specks of dust, invisible to the naked eye, can obscure a cluster of several pixels. For this reason, techniques have been developed to remove their appearance from a scan, see film restoration.

The simplest is the median filter, often called despeckle in many graphic manipulation programs, e.g. in Adobe Photoshop and the GIMP. It works by examining a pixel in relation to the pixels surrounding it; if it is too different from the surrounding pixels then it is replaced with one set to their median value. This and other methods can be quite effective but have the disadvantage that the filter cannot know what actually is dust or noise. It will also degrade fine detail in the scan.

=== Infrared cleaning ===
Infrared cleaning works by collecting an infrared channel from the scan at the same time as the visible colour channels (red, green, and blue). This is done by using a light source that also produces infrared radiation, and having a fourth row of sensors on the linear CCD sensor. Photographic film is mostly transparent to infrared radiation (no matter what the visible image contains) but dust and scratches aren't, so they show up in the IR channel. This information can then be used to automatically remove the appearance of dust and scratches in the visible channels and replace them with something similar to their surroundings. A major limitation of this technique is that it can only be used on dye-based (color and chromogenic black-and-white) films; the image-forming silver particles in most black-and-white film stocks are opaque to infrared radiation.

Scanner manufacturers usually have their own name attached to this technique. Kodak developed Digital ICE at their Austin development centre, and is licensed by Epson, Konica Minolta, Microtek, Minolta, Nikon, and some others. Canon developed its own FARE (Film Automatic Retouching and Enhancement) system. LaserSoft Imaging developed the iSRD dust and scratch removal, on which among others Plustek is relying.

=== Additional enhancements ===
In some scanners, film grain removal (Digital GEM), restoration of faded colors (Digital ROC), and contrast / exposure correction (Digital DEE) can be performed automatically during the scan. Collectively, Digital ICE^{3} includes dust and scratch removal, Digital GEM, and Digital ROC; Digital ICE^{4} adds Digital DEE.

== See also ==
- Image scanner
- Motion picture film scanner
