= Nikon Coolpix S10 =

Digital camera model

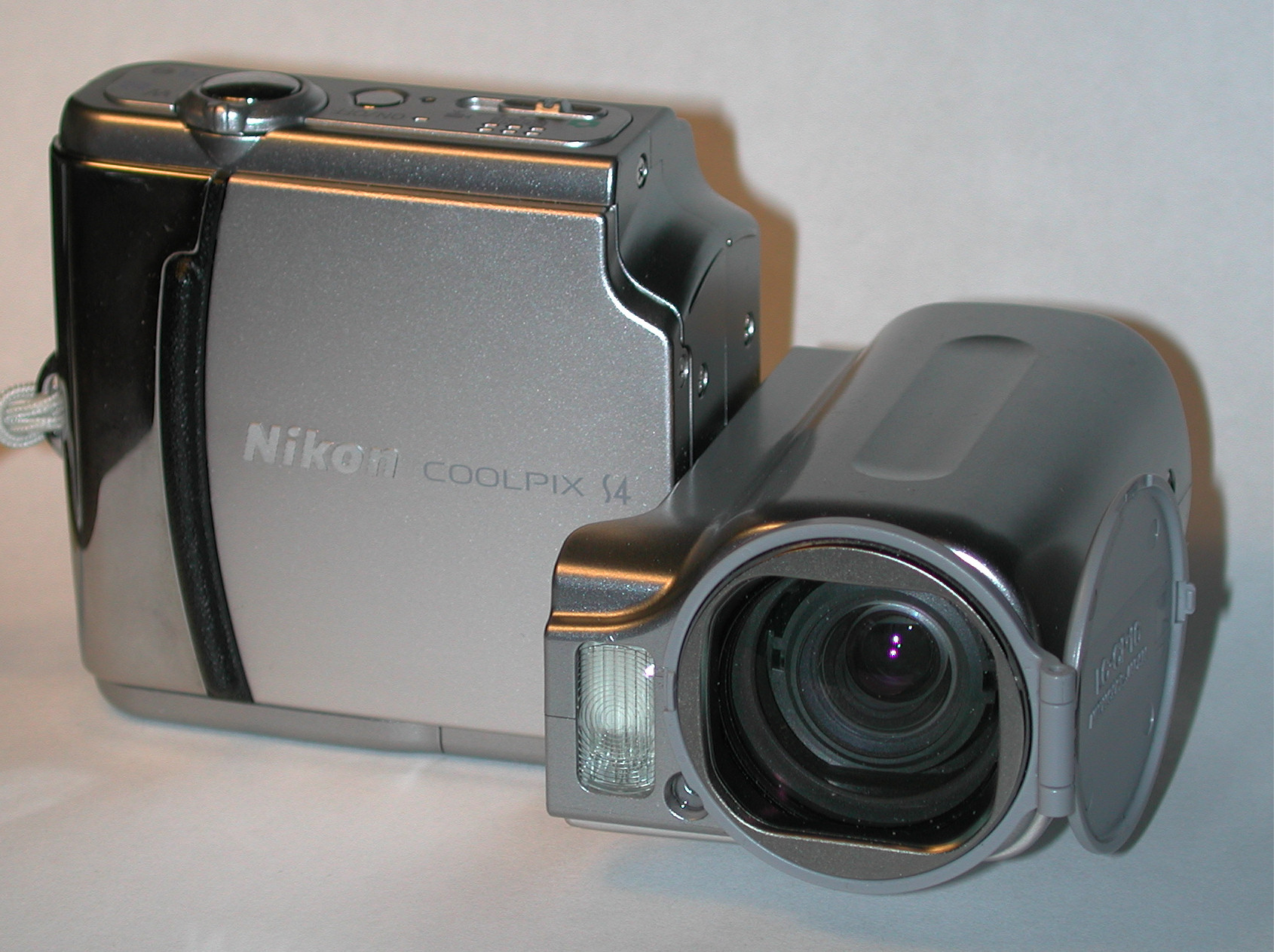
- Pictured: the Nikon Coolpix S4, a camera released the year before the S10 with similar form-factor

Overview
- Maker: Nikon
- Released: September 2006

Lens
- Lens: 10x Optical Zoom-Nikkor 38-380mm Glass Lens (35mm equivalent)
- F-numbers: f3.5

Sensor/medium
- Sensor type: CCD
- Sensor size: 2825 x 2124
- Maximum resolution: 2,816 × 2,112
- Film speed: 50, 100, 200, 400, 800 (ISO equivalent)
- Recording medium: SD/MMC card + 16MB internal memory

Focusing
- Focus modes: Center; Manual
- Focus areas: 99

Exposure/metering
- Exposure metering: Center weighted

Shutter
- Shutter speed range: 1/2 sec to 1/1000 sec
- Continuous shooting: 1.2 frame/s

Viewfinder
- Viewfinder: No

Image processing
- White balance: Auto with TTL control or 7-mode manual

General
- Video recording: 640 x 480 @ 30fps
- LCD screen: 2.5", 230,000 pixel TFT
- Battery: 1 EN-EL5 Lithium Ion rechargeable
- AV port(s): USB, Composite video RCA
- Data port: USB
- Body features: Metal
- Dimensions: 112.5×74.5×40.5 mm (4.43×2.93×1.59 in)
- Weight: 220g (7.8 oz) [Not inc batteries, memory card, or lens cap]
- Made in: Japan

Chronology
- Predecessor: Nikon Coolpix S4

The Coolpix S10 is a model of digital camera formerly produced by Nikon and first released in September 2006 as part of the Coolpix Series. Its image sensor is a CCD with 6.0 million pixels. It has a 2.5-inch (64 mm) thin-film transistor liquid crystal display device with 230,000 pixels. The S10 incorporates Nikon's popular swivel design first seen in the Coolpix 900 which allows for a powerful Nikkor 10X Optical zoom lens while retaining a compact form. Other features include D-Lighting and Face-priority AF.

The 2006 Nikon Coolpix S10 has a similar 10x swivel lens design as the 2005 S4, but with more advanced features such as vibration reduction and a lithium-ion battery.

== Noted use ==
The Coolpix S10 was used by photographer Noah Kalina to capture a series of self-portraits in his video Everyday. He began using this camera for the project in 2008.

== See also ==
- Nikon Coolpix S1
- Nikon Coolpix S3
- Nikon Coolpix S4
- Nikon Coolpix 950
