= Infrared cleaning =

Image scanning technology

Infrared cleaning is a technique used by some film scanners and flatbed scanners to reduce or remove the effect of dust and scratches upon the finished scan. It works by collecting an additional infrared channel from the scan at the same position and resolution as the three visible color channels (red, green, and blue). The infrared channel, in combination with the other channels, is used to detect the location of scratches and dust. Once located, those defects can be corrected by scaling or replaced by inpainting.

== Method ==
The three color dyes in typical color film emulsions are largely transparent to infrared light, so the infrared image is almost uniformly clear, unlike the RGB images. On the other hand, dust absorbs and scratches scatter the infrared. Any dust spots or scratches appear as dark marks in the infrared, making them easy to find and compensate for.

Pixels that are partially occluded (for example, the dust only obscures a small portion of the pixel) may be corrected by scaling. The infrared pixel value indicates the fractional amount of the occlusion, and RGB values can be scaled appropriately.

If most or all of a pixel is occluded, scaling is not feasible. Instead, the pixel value may be interpolated from nearby good pixels (inpainting).

Infrared cleaning is not possible with media which are not transparent to infrared. In particular the silver particles in silver halide black-and-white film respond equally to visible and infrared light, with no difference between dark pixels and dust, and infrared cleaning is not possible. Infrared cleaning does work with chromogenic black-and-white films, which do not contain silver particles.

Some film dyes also block infrared to a considerable extent; infrared cleaning works with Ektachrome slide film, but it is more difficult to find dust spots with the infrared-blocking dyes used in Kodachrome. Some software algorithms, such as the latest ICE implementation (Nikon Super Coolscan LS-9000 ED with Digital ICE Professional), VueScan's and SilverFast's, claim to use infrared cleaning to find dust spots even when scanning Kodachrome.

== Infrared scanning ==
Scanners use three different techniques for doing this:

- Nikon film scanners use four colored light-emitting diodes which are pulsed on and off, one at a time. These LEDs are pulsed on and off at each scan position, the light is gathered by a linear array and then the CCD is moved to the next scan line.
- Minolta film scanners use a constant visible light source with a pulsed infrared light source. At each scan position, the scanner uses an RGB linear array to scan the film in RGB and RGB+Infrared. This is as fast as the Nikon approach, since only one physical pass over the film needs to be done.
- Flatbed scanners and some film scanners have two different light sources, an RGB light source and an infrared light source. These scanners make two passes over the film - once for RGB and once for infrared. This is slower than the Nikon or Minolta approach, since two passes need to be made over the film. It also produces lower quality since software methods need to be used to align the two passes. In addition, the two light sources usually have a different focus position and produce images that are stretched in the CCD direction, which results in another source of lower quality.

== History ==
IBM originally developed and patented infrared cleaning, and subsequently licensed this patent to Applied Science Fiction (ASF). Canon had a patent cross-licensing agreement with IBM, and thus was able to use IBM's infrared cleaning patent. Canon could not use the trademarked Digital ICE name, so instead called it Film Automatic Retouching and Enhancement (FARE). Other companies, including Hamrick Software and LaserSoft Imaging, independently developed infrared cleaning algorithms which are completely different from IBM's patented algorithm.

ASF subsequently went out of business, having spent all their money trying to develop dry film development in a kiosk at a time when digital photography was replacing film. Kodak purchased the assets of ASF, but did not use any of its technologies.
