= Nikon Coolpix S4 =

Digital camera model

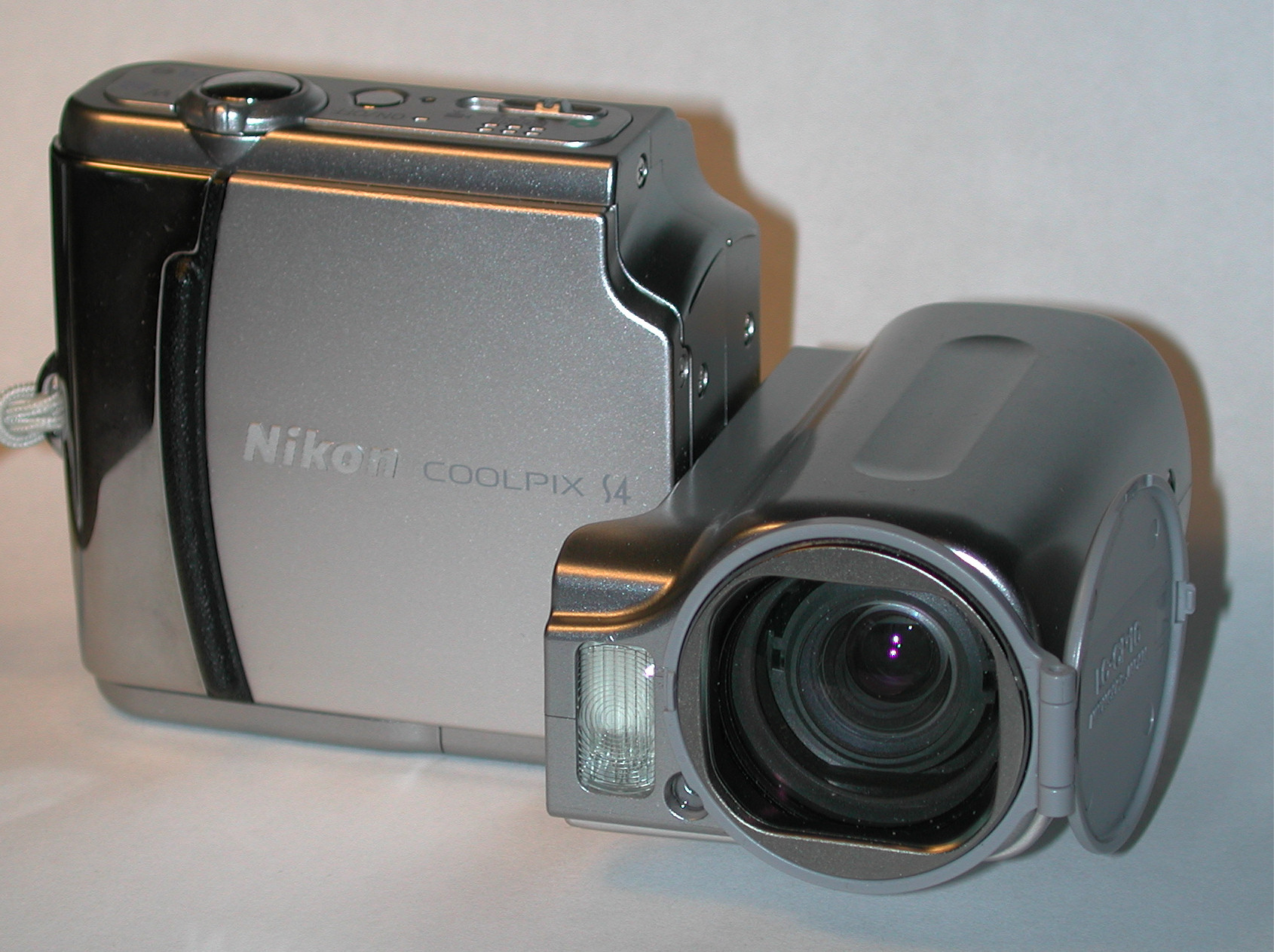
- Maker: Nikon

Lens
- Lens: 10x Optical Zoom-Nikkor 38-380mm Glass Lens (35mm equivalent)

Sensor/medium
- Sensor: CCD
- Maximum resolution: 2,816 × 2,112
- Film speed: 50, 100, 200, 400 (ISO equivalent)
- Storage media: SD/MMC card + 13.5MB internal memory

Focusing
- Focus areas: Auto (5-area automatic focus selection) and center-focus area selection available

Flash
- Flash: Built in flash. Range: 1 ft 4 in to 10 ft/0.4-3.0m

Shutter
- Shutter speed range: 2 sec to 1/2000 sec
- Continuous shooting: 1.3 frame/s

Viewfinder
- Viewfinder: No

General
- LCD screen: 2.5", 110,000 pixel TFT
- Battery: AA NiMH (2) batteries
- Weight: 205g (7.2) oz [Not inc batteries or memory card)

The Coolpix S4 is a brand of digital camera produced by Nikon. Its image sensor is a CCD with 6.0 million pixels. It has a 2.5-inch (64 mm) thin-film transistor liquid crystal display device with 110,000 pixels. The S4 incorporates Nikon's popular swivel design which allows the addition of a powerful Nikkor 10X Optical zoom lens, yet retain a compact form. Other features include D-Lighting and Face-priority AF.

Nikon later released the Nikon Coolpix S10, which has a similar 10x swivel lens design as the S4, but with more advanced features such as vibration reduction and a lithium-ion battery.

== See also ==
- Nikon Coolpix S1
- Nikon Coolpix S3
- Nikon Coolpix S10
- Nikon Coolpix 950
- Nikon Coolpix 995
- Nikon Coolpix 4500
