= SilverFast =

Software suite for image processing

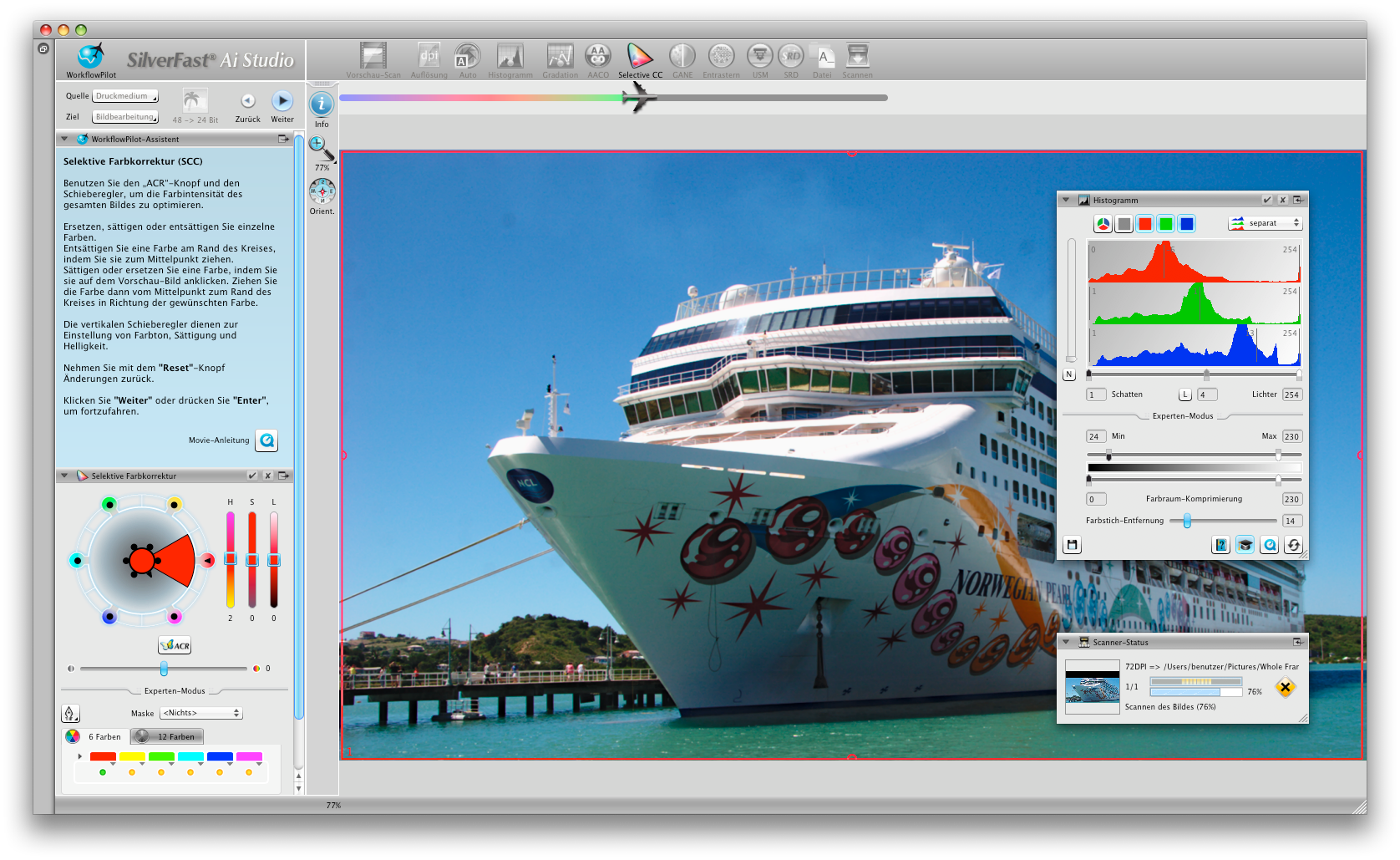
- SilverFast Ai Studio GUI
- Developer: LaserSoft Imaging
- Release: 1995; 31 years ago
- Stable release: 9.2.4 / May 7, 2024; 2 years ago
- Operating system: Windows 7 and later macOS 10.13 and later
- Platform: X64, ARM64 (scanner dependent)
- Available in: Multi-lingual
- Type: Image scanning, image processing
- License: Commercial proprietary software
- Website: www.silverfast.com

SilverFast is a family of software for image scanning and processing, including photos, documents and slides, developed by LaserSoft Imaging. There are also other applications for image processing using digital cameras or printers, and for 48-bit raw data image processing.

== History ==
SilverFast was introduced in 1995 and is still under development today. Some scanner manufacturers bundle their hardware with SilverFast software. Some of the features developed for SilverFast, especially in the area of color management, error detection and automatic dust and scratch removal, have been patented. The European Digital Press Association named SilverFast the "Best colour management software of the year 2008" for improving the dynamic range of most scanners and for creating ICC profiles automatically. In 2011, version 8 was introduced, and HDR imaging software followed in 2012. SilverFast 9 was released in 2020.

=== Patents ===
- 2005: Patent granted on barcode technology used for the Auto IT8 Calibration. (Karl-Heinz Zahorsky, EP 1594301, expired)
- 2008: Patent granted on technology used for SilverFast Multi-Exposure@. (Karl-Heinz Zahorsky, EP 1744278, US 8,693,808)
- 2023: Patent granted on the ExpressScan, a scanning method that reduces scanning time for flatbed scanners. (Karl-Heinz Zahorsky, EP 4109866, US 11,558,529 B2)

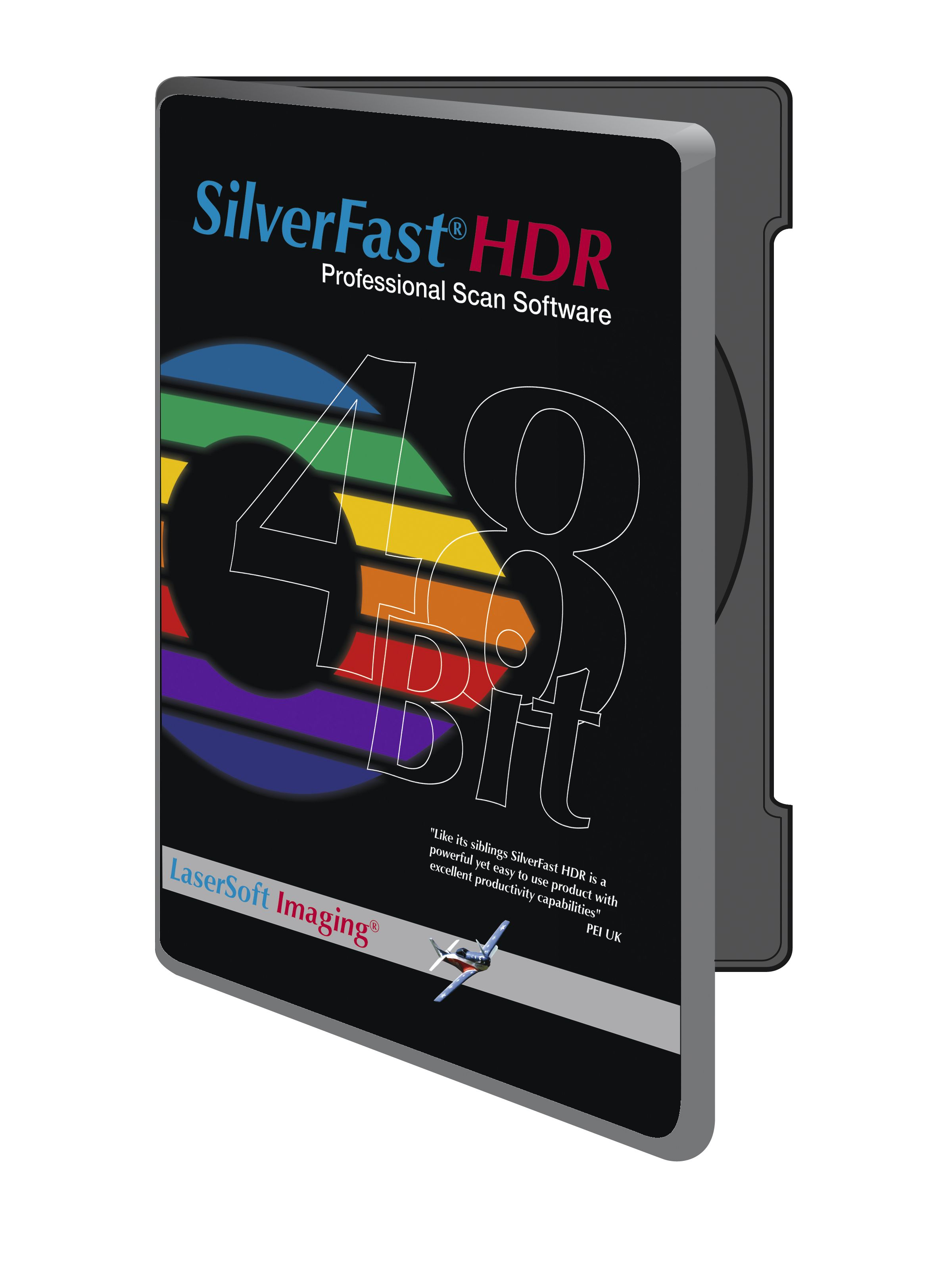
SilverFast HDR

== Products ==
SilverFast is supplied configured for the specified scanner model. If several scanners are operated, it is therefore necessary to purchase a corresponding number of additional licenses. Upgrade rates are also offered when purchasing a new scanner.

Overview of the available products:

Scanner Software	HDR Software	Archiving Software	Photoshop Plug-ins
SilverFast SE	SilverFast HDR	SilverFast Archive Suite ^{1), 2)}	SRDx Plug-in
SilverFast SE Plus ^{1), 2)}	SilverFast HDR Studio		
SilverFast Ai Studio ^{1), 2)}			
SilverFast X-Ray			

^{1)} including: Multi-Exposure ^{2)} optional: ICC Printer Calibration

=== Optional features ===
As marked in the table above, some products are available with additional features:

Multi-Exposure – an exposure blending technique for scanning transparent originals like slides, negatives, and film strips with increased dynamic range. This is accomplished by scanning the original multiple times with different exposure times, increasing the dynamic range and preserving detail in the light and shadow areas of the image. Multi-Exposure does not work with reflective originals and differs from "Multi-Sampling," which also scans multiple times but with unaltered exposure.

ICC Printer Calibration – calibrates the printer using a previously calibrated flatbed scanner as the measuring device for profiling the printer.

=== SilverFast scanner software ===
It can be used as a stand-alone application, as a Photoshop plug-in, or as a universal TWAIN module. Versions include:

- SilverFast SE (basic edition)
- SilverFast SE Plus (plus edition / with Multi-Exposure)
- SilverFast Ai Studio (premium edition)
- SilverFast X-Ray (a special version of SilverFast designed to digitize radiographic films for scientific and medical radiography)

=== SilverFast HDR software ===
SilverFast HDR processes 48-bit raw images. Many newer scanners are able to output the image directly with all available data instead of reducing it to 24-bit; this 48-bit raw image can be saved immediately and digital processing performed later.

- SilverFast HDR (basic edition)
- SilverFast HDR Studio (premium edition)

SilverFast HDR contains the functionality of SilverFast Ai Studio for 48-bit raw data, such as defining output size and resolution, auto-adjusting of highlights and shadows, three-part histogram, gradation curves, selective color correction, unsharp masking, color cast removal slider, color separation, and CMYK-preview. SilverFast HDR can be used as a native plug-in for Adobe Photoshop, as a universal TWAIN module, or as a stand-alone application.

HDR Studio has AACO (Auto-Adaptive Contrast Optimization), JPEG 2000, USMPlus (Unsharp Mask Plus), CloneTool and PrinTao.

==== HDRi (64Bit RAW data with infrared channel) ====
With version 6.6.1 any SilverFast HDR version supports the proprietary RAW data format HDRi. These 64-bit HDRi color files and 32-bit HDRi greyscale files contain additional 16-bit infrared RAW data besides the 48-bit color RAW data and 16-bit greyscale RAW data respectively. Therefore, a scanner with an infrared channel available to the software is necessary. This RAW format can keep any readable image information for later post-processing.

The acronym "HDR" as used by SilverFast is not related to High-dynamic-range imaging, a widely used technique to increase the dynamic range of (digital) images.

The data format is:

Format	Encoding	Compression	Color space	Color depth (Bit per pixel)	Dynamic range (Dimensions of 10)	Relative gradation
HDRi (.tif, .tiff)	RGB (linear)	none	RGB	64 = 48 + 16 (infrared channel)	4,8	0,0014%
HDRi (.tif, .tiff)	RGB (linear)	none	RGB	32 = 16 + 16 (Infrared channel)	4,8	0,0014%

=== SilverFast archiving software ===
The SilverFast Archive Suite includes SilverFast Ai Studio and SilverFast HDR Studio with an integrated color management system. This package is suitable for archiving slides, negatives, and photos, whereas the post-processing can take place any time after scanning.

- SilverFast Archive Suite – consisting of SilverFast Ai Studio and SilverFast HDR Studio (premium edition)

=== PrintTao 8 ===
PrintTao 8 is a discontinued software product for Canon and Epson large format printers. It could be used as a stand-alone application or as a plug-in for Adobe Photoshop and Adobe Lightroom. PrinTao 8 handled color management and all printer driver settings. It contained various printing templates such as pack templates for portrait photographers, or gallery wrap templates for printing on canvas.

=== SRDx Photoshop plug-in ===
SRDx (Smart Removal of Defects) is a plug-in for Adobe Photoshop to remove defects like dust particles, specks, small scratches and finger prints from digital images. Most dust and scratch removal tools use blur effects which degrade overall image quality. SRDx works without any unsharpening effects. It uses an adjustable automatic detection of dust and scratches that can be fine-tuned manually using a defect marker and a rubber tool.

=== SilverFast DC ===
SilverFast DC is a discontinued stand-alone software for digital camera image processing. It contained features for reading the image data from the camera, for processing, optimizing, and archiving the images on the computer, as well as for printing the edited images.

== IT8 calibration and color management ==
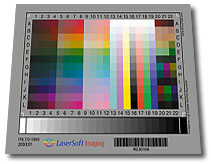
IT8.7/1 target by LaserSoft Imaging

Scanner calibration: SilverFast is equipped with a color management system that enables largely automated IT8 color calibration of the scanner using IT8 targets supplied by the manufacturer, LaserSoft Imaging.

- according to ISO standard 12641-1 (from 1993): conventional standard
- according to ISO standard 12641-2 (from 2020): new standard for a more precise IT8 calibration with about 3 times the number of measuring fields. LaserSoft Imaging cooperated for creating this standard.

Printer calibration: SilverFast also enables printer calibration by printing a color table and then scanning it using an already calibrated scanner to create an ICC profile.

== Supported devices ==
SilverFast supports 325 scanners. Most Microsoft Windows-only 35mm USB scanners sold under various names are not supported. Each scanner model requires a separate license.

=== Heidelberg drum scanner ===
SilverFast Ai Studio supports prepress drum scanners made by Heidelberger Druckmaschinen AG (Linotype – Hell) on Microsoft Windows 2000, XP, Vista and 7, as well as Mac OS X 10.3-10.5 operating systems. Supported models include the Chromagraph 3300/3400, Tango/XL, Topaz, Nexscan, and Primescan.

== See also ==
Software supporting many scanner models:

- Image Capture – bundled with Mac OS X
- Scanner Access Now Easy (SANE) – multiplatform open source scanner API
- VueScan
