= Digital ICE =

Technique used to automatically remove dust and scratches from scanned film stock

Digital Image Correction and Enhancement (Digital ICE) is a set of technologies related to producing an altered image in a variety of frequency spectra. The objective of these technologies is to render an image more usable by Fourier or other filtering techniques. These technologies were most actively advanced in the 1960s and early 1970s in the fields of strategic reconnaissance and medical electronics.

The term Digital ICE initially applied specifically to a proprietary technology developed by Kodak's Austin Development Center, formerly Applied Science Fiction (ASF), that automatically removes surface defects, such as dust and scratches, from scanned images.

== Technology ==
The ICE technology works from within the scanner, so unlike the software-only solutions it does not alter any underlying details of the image. Subsequent to the original Digital ICE technology (circa 1989), which used infrared cleaning, additional image enhancement technologies were marketed by Applied Science Fiction and Kodak under similar and related names, often as part of a suite of compatible technologies. The ICE technology uses a scanner with a pair of light sources, a normal RGB lamp and an infrared (IR) lamp, and scans twice, once with each lamp. The IR lamp detects the dust locations with its unique detection method, and then inpainting is applied based on this data afterwards. The general concept is locate scratches and dust on the RGB image and mask them.

=== Limitations of Digital ICE ===
Digital ICE is used to detect scratches and dust during transparent film scan and is not applicable for opaque document scanning. For some positive films with white-colored fine structures in a dark background, their opaque areas may be removed or given a fuzzy edge. While chromogenic black-and-white films are supported by Digital ICE, other black-and-white films containing metallic silver, which form from silver halides during the development process of the film, are not. This is because the long wave infrared light passes through the slide but not through dust particles. The silver particles reflect the infrared light in a similar manner to dust particles, thus respond equally in visible light and infrared. A similar phenomenon also prevents Kodak Kodachrome slides from being scanned with Digital ICE. Kodachrome's cyan layer absorbs infrared.

=== Further development ===
Kodak's own scanner, the "pro-lab" Kodak HR500 Plus was equipped with Digital ICE that could scan Kodachrome slides effectively; however, this scanner was discontinued in 2005. Nikon produced the Nikon Super Coolscan LS-9000 ED scanner with a new version of ICE (Digital ICE Professional) from 2004 until it was discontinued in 2010. This was capable of scanning Kodachrome slides reliably, dust- and scratch-free, without additional software. LaserSoft Imaging released an infrared dust and scratch removal tool (iSRD - Infrared Smart Removal of Defects) in 2008, that allows Nikon's film scanners for Mac OS X and Microsoft Windows, as well as many scanners from other manufacturers to make high quality scans of Kodachrome slides. Fujifilms system for dust and scratch removal, called "Image Intelligence", works on a similar principle as Digital ICE and will also work on Kodachrome film.

== See also ==
- FARE (Canon) (Film Automatic Retouching and Enhancement)
- Infrared cleaning
