= Swivel lens =

Lens that freely rotates while attached to a camera body

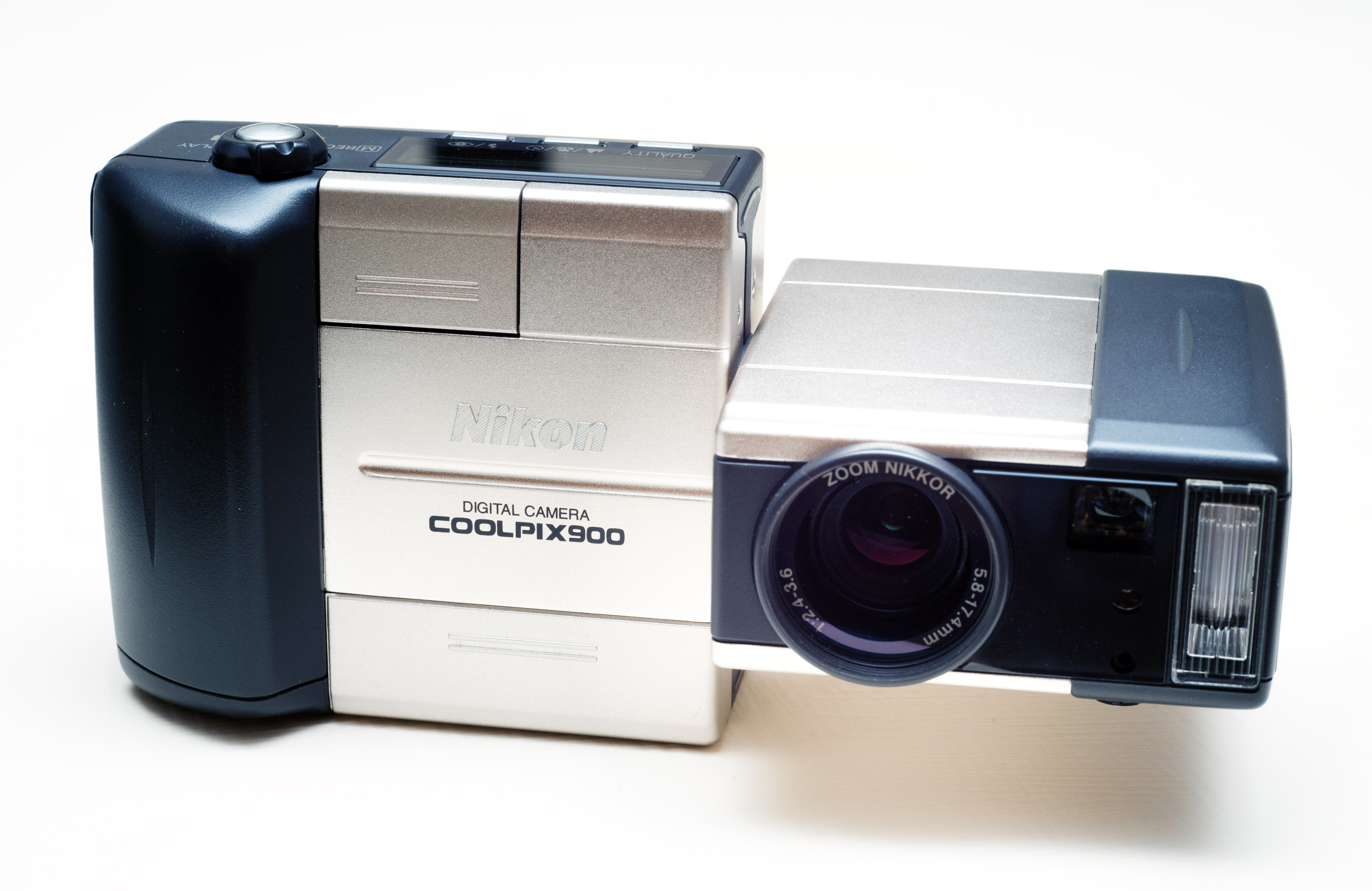
A Nikon CoolPix 900 (1998), an early swivel-lens design.

A swivel lens is a lens that freely rotates while attached to a camera body. They are used on some compact digital and video cameras (camcorders). These lenses make it easy for a photographer to aim a camera without moving around too much. Swivel lenses come in different sizes and shapes. A swivel lens is also known as a swiveling lens, swivelling lens, and rotating lens.

In contrast, swivel LCDs (also known as articulating screen) are displays that freely rotate while attached to a camera body. Usually, the camera body is much larger than the swivelling display. Swivel LCD devices can be considered as swivel lens devices because the camera body can swivel around the small display; albeit, aiming the camera is more difficult. Most camcorders have a swivel LCD.

== Uses ==
- Enables the user to take pictures from unique perspectives and camera angles
- Easy composition of images without the need to bend, crouch, or move around
- Shooting self-portraits
- Shooting candid photos

== List of cameras that have swivel lens ==
- Minolta DiMAGE V
- Ricoh RDC-4200
- Nikon Coolpix 2500, 3500, 4500
- Nikon Coolpix S4, S10
- Nikon Coolpix 900, 950, 990, 995
- Sony DSC-U50
- Sony DSC-F77, DSC-F77A, DSC-F88
- Sony DSC-F505, DSC-F505V, DSC-F717, F828
- Sony Webbie HD MHS-PM1
- Sony Bloggie MHS-PM5 and MHS-PM5K
- Bushnell Nighthawk 260900 (night vision)
- Panasonic D-Snap SV-AS10, SV-AS30
- Casio QV-10, QV-11, QV-2900UX, EX-TR100
- Contax SL300RT*, U4R
- Pentax Optio X
- Agfa ephoto 1280
- Kyocera SL300R, SL400R

== List of other devices with swivel lens ==
- Sony Clie PDA (various PEG-XXXX models)
- Sony PlayStation Portable camera
- Game Boy Camera which swivels horizontally for self-portraits
- Veo SD camera for Toshiba e805 pocket pc
- Notion Ink Adam

=== Cellphones ===
- LG CU500
- LG VX7000
- Nokia N90
- Samsung V200, SCH-U740

=== Cellphones with pseudo swivel lens ===
Some cellphones have lens that rotate and allow users to take self-portraits but are limited in the angles where the camera can take pictures.

- Samsung SPH-A900
- Samsung SGH-T809 (also known as Samsung D820)
- Samsung A930
- Nokia 3250

=== Notebooks/Laptops ===
- Sony VAIO PCG-GT1
- Sony VAIO PCG-GT3/K
- Sony VAIO C1 Series
- Asus M50VM

== See also ==
- Articulating screen
