= Nikon Coolpix 4500 =

Digital camera model

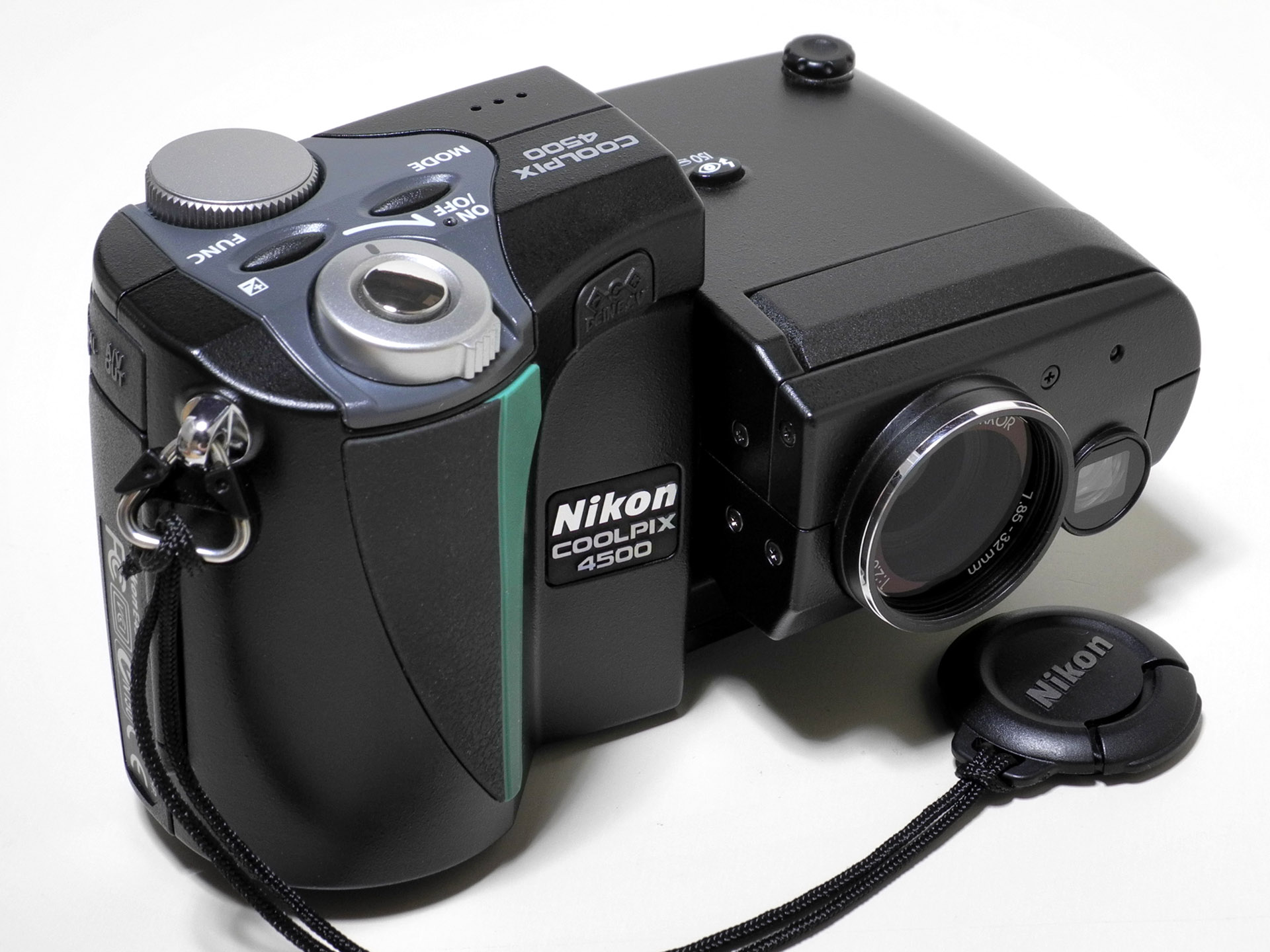

Lens
- Lens: 4x (7.85-32mm) Zoom Nikkor; 1:2.6-5.1

Sensor/medium
- Sensor: 1:1.8" CCD
- Maximum resolution: 4 megapixel 2,272 x 1,704
- Film speed: Auto, 100, 200, 400, 800 (ISO equivalent)
- Storage media: CF Card

Exposure/metering
- Exposure metering: Matrix, centre-weighted, spot and AF spot

Flash
- Flash: yes

Shutter
- Shutter speed range: 1/2300 to 8min in various modes

Viewfinder
- Viewfinder: yes (optical, 80% frame coverage, dioptre adjust)

Image processing
- White balance: auto, flash, manual preset, fluorescent (white, neutral/daylight white, daylight), incandescent, cloudy, sunny (the latter three modes offer color temperature compensation adjustment from -3 to +3 unit steps)
- WB bracketing: yes

General
- LCD screen: 1.5 inch TFT 110,000 dots
- Battery: Nikon EN-EL1 Lithium-Ion & charger
- Dimensions: Height: 2.9 in. (73mm); Width: 5.2 in. (130mm); Depth: 2.0 in. (50mm)
- Weight: 0.360 kg

The Nikon Coolpix 4500 is a digital camera — the penultimate model in the famous 950-995 lineup of swivel lens models. The last model was the Nikon Coolpix S4, most of its features match the Nikon 995. The Coolpix 4500 was announced by Nikon on May 29, 2002.

It's a 4 MP model with 4x optical zoom lens and has many manual controls. Like its predecessors, it takes sharp photos (though some claim the 995 is sharper) and has a long shutter lag.

Its minimum focus range is 30 cm but reduced to 2 cm in macro mode.

Its automation manages 16 pre-programmed Scene modes to facilitate shooting (landscape, portrait, macro, sunset/moonlight, panorama assistant, text, museum, party/indoor, twilight, backlight, beach / snow, night portrait, combination of shots, fireworks, night, sports). Exposure adjustment is automatic and also allows for manual mode with adjustment within a range of ±2.0 in 0.33 EV increments.

The white balance is done automatically, but also semi-manually with pre-set options (sunny, incandescent light, fluorescent tubes, cloudy, flash).

Its built-in flash has an effective range of 0.5 to 3 m in wide-angle and 0.5 to 1.6 m in telephoto, and has a red-eye reduction function.

The “BSS” function (Best Shot Selector) selects from ten successive shots the best exposed image and saves automatically.

The “Noise reduction” function is automatically activated when the shutter speed is slow.

Its burst mode allows you to take 5 images per second.

Nikon stopped marketing in 2006.

== See also ==
- Nikon Coolpix 950
- Nikon Coolpix 995
- Nikon Coolpix S4
