= Nikon Coolpix S3 =

Digital camera model

Overview
- Maker: Nikon
- Type: Compact digital camera

Sensor/medium
- Storage media: Approx. 12MB, SD memory card (optional)

General
- Battery: Approx. 190 shots with rechargeable battery EN-EL8
- Dimensions: 89.9×57.5×19.7 mm (3.54×2.26×0.78 in)
- Weight: Approx. 118 g (4.2 oz) (without battery and memory card)

The Coolpix S3 is a digital camera branded by Nikon. Its image sensor is a CCD with 6 million effective pixels (6.4 million total) with a 2.5-inch thin-film transistor liquid crystal display.

== See also ==
- Nikon Coolpix series
- Nikon Coolpix S1
- Nikon Coolpix S10
