= Nikon Coolpix S1 =

Digital camera model

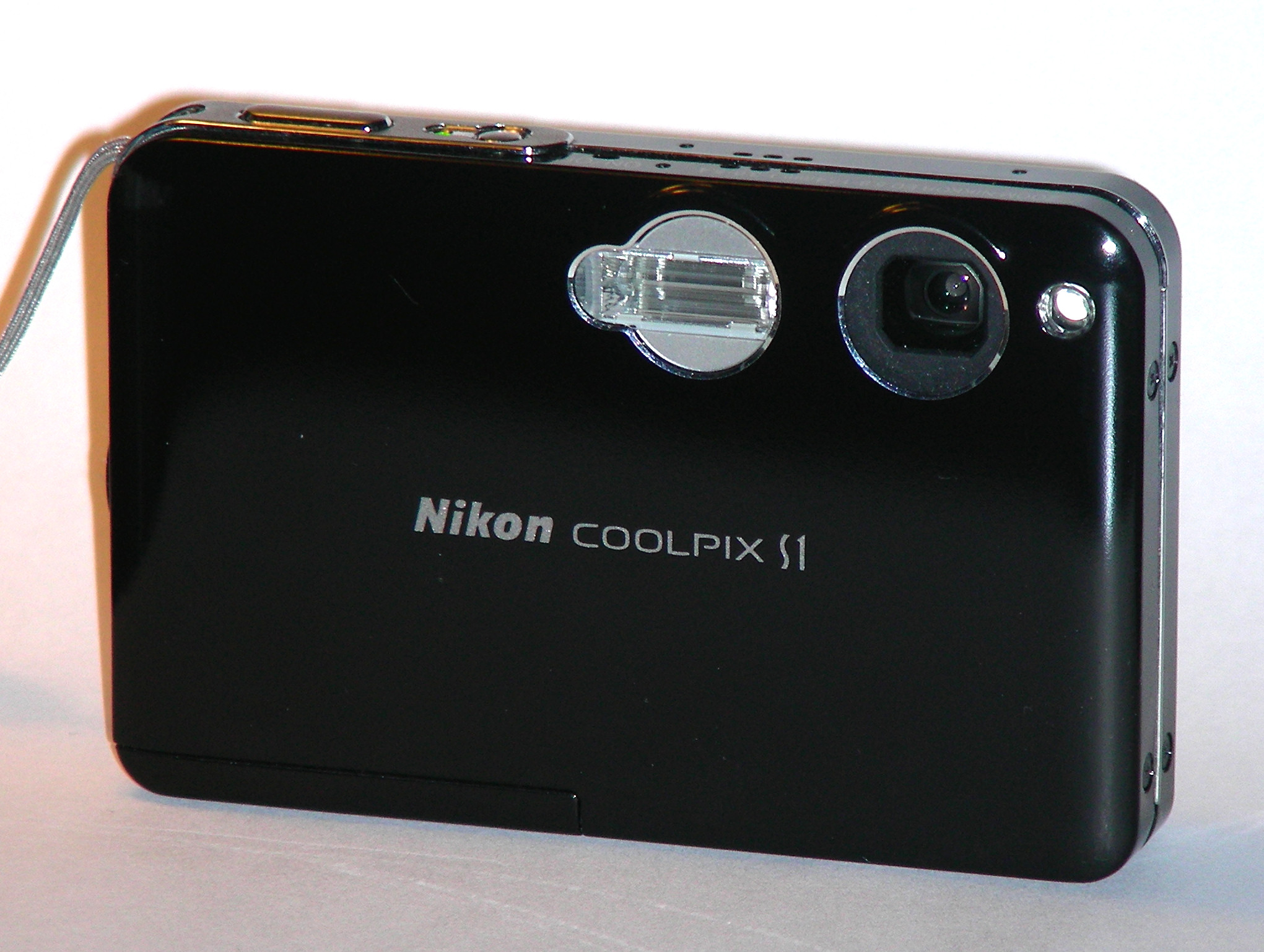
- Coolpix S1 black

Overview
- Maker: Nikon
- Type: Point-and-shoot

Lens
- Lens: Zoom Nikkor ED 5.8-17.4mm 1:3.0-5.4

Sensor/medium
- Sensor: CCD
- Maximum resolution: 2,592 × 1,944 (5.00 million)
- Film speed: 50, 100, 200, 400 (ISO equivalent)
- Storage media: SD/MMC card + Internal

Focusing
- Focus modes: Single AF, Face-priority AF
- Focus areas: Multi-area AF
- Focus bracketing: No

Exposure/metering
- Exposure modes: Auto, Scene
- Exposure metering: 256 segment Matrix linked to AF area
- Metering modes: No manual exposure

Flash
- Flash: Built-in flash
- Flash bracketing: No

Shutter
- Shutter: Electronic/mechanical
- Shutter speed range: 2 sec to 1/350 sec
- Continuous shooting: Continuous shooting

Viewfinder
- Viewfinder: No

Image processing
- White balance: Auto, Presets
- WB bracketing: No

General
- LCD screen: 2.5", 110,000 pixel TFT
- Battery: Nikon EN-EL8 Lithium-Ion & charger
- Optional battery packs: 2005
- Dimensions: 90×58×20 mm (3.54×2.28×0.79 in)
- Weight: 170 g (6 oz) [inc. battery]

The Coolpix S1 is a brand of digital camera produced by Nikon since 2005. It belongs to Nikon's slim and stylish S-series of compact cameras designed for casual everyday photography.

Its image sensor is a CCD with 5.0 million pixels. It has a 2.5-inch thin-film transistor liquid crystal display device with 110,000 pixels. The camera uses a 3× optical zoom Zoom-Nikkor ED lens, equivalent to approximately 35–105mm in 35mm format.

The Coolpix S1 includes Nikon features such as Face-priority autofocus and D-Lighting, which helps brighten underexposed areas in photographs. It can also record motion clips with sound at VGA resolution.

The camera stores images on SD or MMC cards, and includes built-in internal memory for limited storage when no memory card is inserted.

The model was sold in several colors including silver, black, and white, and was noted for its sliding front cover that protected the lens while powering the camera on and off.

== See also ==
- Nikon Coolpix S3
- Nikon Coolpix S10
