= Nikon Coolpix 950 =

Digital camera model

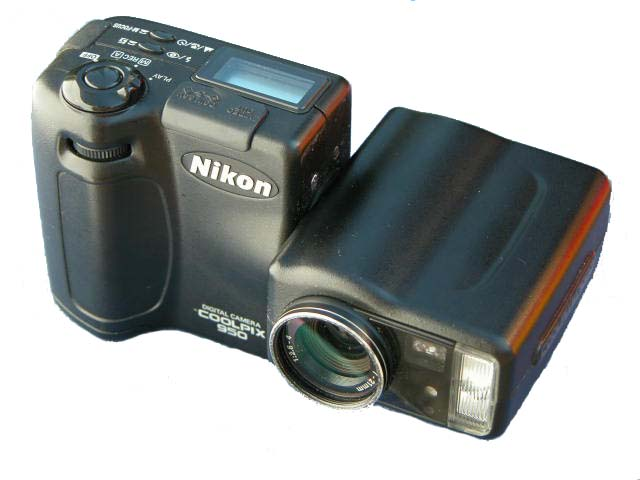
- Maker: Nikon

Sensor/medium
- Sensor: CCD

The Nikon Coolpix 950 was a digital camera released by Nikon in early 1999. The 950 model superseded the Coolpix 900 in the Nikon Coolpix series. The Coolpix 950 was a durable camera with swivel lens, magnesium body, a maximum resolution of 1600×1200 (1.92 Mpx), 3× optical zoom and a minimum focusing distance of 2 cm. It was in turn superseded by the Coolpix 990.

The 950 incorporated improvements over the 900 such as a stronger swivel hinge, a magnesium case (except the plastic battery door) and increased sensor resolution. The 950's ability to capture directly in TIFF format was unusual for the time, although the file transfer time (depending on CF card write speed available at the time) could be over 30 seconds in this mode. The 950 came with a 8MB CF card, and the card could contain only 1 image file shot in the TIFF mode (~5.6MB). The maximum CF capacity for the 950 is 64MB.

Other advanced features of the 950 included shutter and aperture priority modes and the ability to custom-preset white balance. The 950 included a flash-sync socket for use with various Nikon external flash units (no shoe-mount was provided, however). As with all 9xx series, the lens movement during focusing and zooming was all internal, resulting in superior weather and dust resistance. The 950 shared with other 9xx series cameras the 28 mm filter threads and shared numerous Nikon and 3rd-party filters and diopter filters.

The 950, like all 9xx series Coolpix cameras, are still used as inexpensive microscopy cameras, primarily due to the exceptional macro capabilities. 28 mm threaded eyepiece adapters for popular commercial microscopes are widely available.

Modern digital cameras filter out most of the infrared spectrum that their sensors detect. The older generation of cameras, such as the Coolpix 950, however, did not filter so much IR light and are still useful today as inexpensive means to achieving this type of photography.

== Known issues ==
A known issue with the camera was the battery compartment door, which was made from plastic. A somewhat cumbersome dual-action latching mechanism for the battery door often complicated this issue and, if operated incorrectly, could result in damage. Any damage to the battery door was troublesome, as the camera would not work at all if the door is unlatched. Fortunately, the door was and is an inexpensive part and could be replaced simply. Otherwise the (new to the 950) magnesium body proved a durable and rugged upgrade from the 900.

Other known issues include the rubber finger grip, which could come loose, and while it caused no functional issues, it was bothersome and affected the "feel" of the camera in the shooting mode. The grip could be replaced with simple rubber cement. (Note: the grip is missing in the photo above.)

The body swivel bearing could become a bit wobbly over time. The 950 featured a much larger and improved bearing than the 900, and the loose bearing did not affect performance.

== See also ==
- Nikon 4500
- Nikon Coolpix 995
- Nikon Coolpix S4
