= VueScan =

Commercial image scanning software

- Developers: Hamrick Software (Ed Hamrick; David Hamrick)
- Release: 1998; 28 years ago
- Stable release: 9.8.59 / 26 September 2026
- Operating system: Windows Vista or later, OS X Mavericks or later, Ubuntu Linux 8.10 or later Red Hat Linux 9 or later
- Platform: IA-32, x86-64, ARM32 and ARM64
- Size: Windows: 12 MB; Mac OS: 11 MB; Linux: 12 MB
- Type: Image scanner and optical character recognition
- License: Shareware
- Website: hamrick.com

VueScan is a computer program for image scanning, especially of photographs, including negatives. It supports optical character recognition (OCR) of text documents. The software can be downloaded and used free of charge, but adds a watermark on scans until a license is purchased.

== Purpose ==
VueScan is intended to work with a large number of image scanners, excluding specialised professional scanners such as drum scanners, on many computer operating systems (OS), even if drivers for the scanner are not available for the OS. These scanners are supplied with device drivers and software to operate them, included in their price. A 2014 review considered that the reasons to purchase VueScan are to allow older scanners not supported by drivers for newer operating systems to be used in more up-to-date systems and for better scanning and processing of photographs (prints; also slides and negatives when supported by scanners) than is afforded by manufacturers' software. The review did not report any advantages to VueScan's processing of documents over other software. The reviewer considered VueScan comparable to SilverFast, a similar program, with support for some specific scanners better in one or the other. Vuescan supports more scanners, with a single purchase giving access to the full range of both film and flatbed scanners, and costs less.

The VueScan program can be used with its own drivers or with drivers supplied by the scanner manufacturer, if supported by the operating system. VueScan drivers can also be used without the VueScan program by application software that supports scanning directly, such as Adobe Photoshop, again enabling the use of scanners without current manufacturers' drivers.

In 2019 when Apple released macOS Catalina, they removed support for running 32-bit programs, including 32-bit drivers for scanning equipment. In response, Hamrick released VueScan 9.7, effectively saving thousands of scanners from being rendered obsolete.

== Overview ==
VueScan enables the user to modify and fine-tune the scanning parameters. The program uses its own independent method to interface with scanner hardware, and can support many older scanners under computer operating systems for which drivers are not available, allowing old scanners to be used with newer platforms that do not otherwise support them.

VueScan supports an increasing number of scanners and digital cameras; 2,400 on Windows, 2,100 on Mac OS X and 1,900 on Linux in 2018.

VueScan is supplied as one downloadable file for each operating system, which supports the full range of scanners. Without the purchase of a license, the program runs in fully functional demonstration mode, identical to Professional mode, except that watermarks are superimposed on saved and printed images. Purchase of a license removes the watermark. A standard license allows updates for one year; a professional license allows unlimited updates and provides some additional features.

VueScan supports optical character recognition (OCR), with English included, and 32 additional language packages available on its website.

In September 2011, VueScan co-developer Ed Hamrick said that he was selling US$3 million per year of VueScan licenses.

== See also ==
- Image Capture — alternative scanner software bundled free with Mac OS X
- Scanner Access Now Easy (SANE) — open-source scanner API for Unix, Windows, OS/2
