= Nikon Coolpix 995 =

Digital camera model

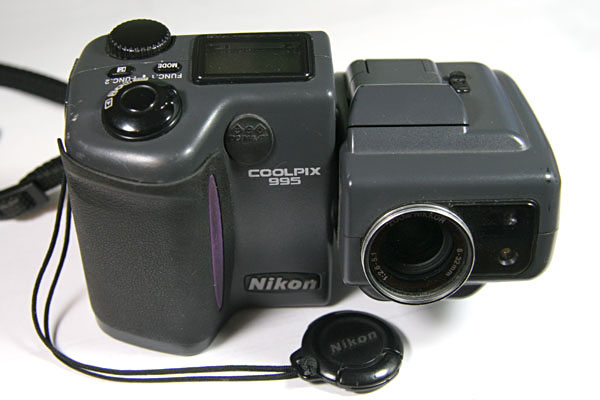

Overview
- Maker: Nikon
- Type: Compact

Lens
- Lens: 4x (8-32mm, 38-152mm equivalent in 35mm format) Zoom Nikkor; 1:2.6-5.1
- F-numbers: Variable Maximum Aperture: f/2.6 - f/5.1

Sensor/medium
- Sensor: CCD
- Maximum resolution: 3.3 megapixels
- Film speed: Auto, 100, 200, 400, 800 (ISO equivalent)
- Storage media: CF Card

Focusing
- Focus modes: Continuous / Single Shot AF, Manual
- Focus areas: 5 Selectable

Exposure/metering
- Exposure bracketing: Yes, 3 or 5 Pictures, +/-1 EV
- Exposure modes: Automatic, Program, Aperture Priority, Shutter Priority, Manual
- Metering modes: 256 Segment Matrix, Center-weighted, Spot, Spot AF Area

Flash
- Flash: Yes, Sync Terminal

Shutter
- Shutter speed range: 8 - 1/2300 sec
- Continuous shooting: Yes

Viewfinder
- Viewfinder: yes (optical, 80% frame coverage, dioptre adjust)

Image processing
- White balance: auto, flash, manual preset, fluorescent (white, neutral/daylight white, daylight), incandescent, cloudy, sunny (the latter three modes offer color temperature compensation adjustment from -3 to +3 unit steps)
- WB bracketing: Yes

General
- LCD screen: 1.8", 112,000 pixel TFT
- Battery: Nikon EN-EL1 Lithium-Ion & charger, or disposable 2CR5 Lithium
- Data port(s): UC-E1 to USB Cable, Video Out
- Weight: 320 g (11.3 oz) [without battery and storage media]
- Latest firmware: 1.7

References
- https://www.dpreview.com/reviews/nikoncp995/23

The Nikon Coolpix 995 was announced on April 25, 2001, to supersede the Coolpix 990 in the Nikon Coolpix series. Similar in appearance to the 990, changes include a switch to a high-impact plastic case for the lens half of the swivel body, a pop-up flash to reduce red-eye by moving the bulb away from the lens, an increase in zoom capability to 4x, CompactFlash Type II compatibility and use of the EN-EL1 rechargeable Li-ion battery in place of the previous four AA batteries.

The Coolpix 9xx series of cameras is noteworthy for the swivel style body. This allowed the user to rotate the lens with respect to the LCD screen and controls providing comfortable viewing in a wide range of shooting positions. The swivel body also allowed a physically much larger lens to be packaged into the camera with a wide telephoto range and exceptional macro capabilities. The internal lens does not use a pop out design and a fixed 28mm threaded lens mounting ring was included at the front. The diameter of the mounting ring happens to coincide with that of most clinical microscopes, resulting in the 9xx series becoming popular for hand-held eyepiece-projection photomicrography. This mounting ring is present on the entire series, making them system cameras; a set of intercompatible telephoto, wide-angle, and fish-eye converters were available, and worked on any of the 9xx cameras.

The Coolpix 9xx cameras were widely considered among the best cameras in their price range. Photographic quality was considered excellent with some minor lens distortions and chromatic aberration. Downsides of the Coolpix 995 included a concern about the robustness of the CF compartment door.

The Coolpix 995 was later superseded by the Coolpix 4500, then by the Coolpix S4, with a 6-megapixel sensor, more point-and-shoot type photography features and less manual modes, among other changes, and the Coolpix s10, with more advanced features such as vibration reduction and a lithium-ion battery.

== See also ==
- Nikon Coolpix 950
- Nikon 4500
- Nikon Coolpix S4
