= LaserSoft Imaging =

German computer software company

LaserSoft Imaging AG
- Type: Private (Aktiengesellschaft)
- Industry: Software
- Founded: 1986
- Founder: Karl-Heinz Zahorsky
- Headquarters: Kiel, Germany
- Area served: worldwide
- Key people: Karl-Heinz Zahorsky (Owner-Manager); Helga Bischof (Manager); Dr. von Hacht (Chairman); Philipp Haarländer (Director Marketing)
- Products: SilverFast
- Number of employees: 30 (2020)

LaserSoft Imaging AG is a software developer designing image processing software such as SilverFast for scanners and large format printers. The company's headquarters is located in Kiel, Germany, 100 kilometres (62 mi) north of Hamburg, and another office in Sarasota, Florida, United States.

== History ==
=== 1986–1990 ===
LaserSoft Imaging was founded in Spring 1986 by the physicist Karl-Heinz Zahorsky, the president of the company today. LaserSoft Imaging became an early adopter of color- and image processing on the Macintosh. It was the first company to distribute video digitizers, such as Pixelogic's 'ProViz' and Truvel's 'TrueScan', the first professional color scanner for the Macintosh, which was first shown at Hannover trade fair CeBIT in 1988, to which LaserSoft Imaging was invited by Apple Computer.

=== 1990–2000 ===
In 1991 LaserSoft Imaging became a registered GmbH and moved into a large Prepress house to help in setting up color reproduction on the desktop and to link Chromacom systems to Macintosh Computers.

With RipLink LaserSoft Imaging presented a system to link major prepress systems, like Hell, Scitex and Crosfield to Macintosh. The distribution of leafscanners started the chapter of high-end scanners on the desktop. LaserSoft Imaging consulted Leaf, Canon, Sony, Seiko and others regarding desktop high end color. LaserSoft Imaging also was involved in the development of the Photone Prepress, after the product had gone through its infant stages. In 1994 LaserSoft Imaging started the development of SilverFast, which was first presented in its early stages at CeBIT 1995. Version 2.0 was demonstrated at CeBIT 1996, version 3.0 was released in December 1996, version 4.0 in 1998. The second office opened in Sarasota, Florida in 1997.

=== 2000–2010 ===
LaserSoft Imaging released SilverFast versions 5.0 in 2000, 6.0 in 2002, 6.5 in 2006, 6.6 in 2008, and 9 in 2020.

LaserSoft Imaging changed the company into a public corporation (Aktiengesellschaft) in 2001; the founder is the sole shareholder. Today, LaserSoft Imaging has implemented scan software for over 300 scanners for Mac OS 9, Mac OS X and Microsoft Windows 98, 2000, XP, Vista. In the beginning LaserSoft Imaging's software was mainly distributed in Germany, but now, SilverFast is distributed globally through distributors as well as world-wide bundle agreements with manufacturers such as Canon, HP, Seiko Epson, Cruse, Leica Camera AG, Microtek, Nikon, Pacific Image Electronics, Pentacon GmbH, PFU/Quato, Plustek, Samsung, and Umax. The company supports high-end scanners such as the Heidelberg (Linotype) Topaz, Tango, Nexscan, and Chromagraph (3300 and 3400). LaserSoft Imaging's SilverFast was awarded "best color management software of the year 2008" by the European Digital Press Association (EDP).

=== 2019-Present ===
In 2019, Lasersoft Imaging's Advanced IT8 Target which conforms to ISO 12641-2:2019 (Part 2: Advanced colour targets for input scanner calibration) specification, was successfully certified through Fogra Research Institute for Media Technologies eV.

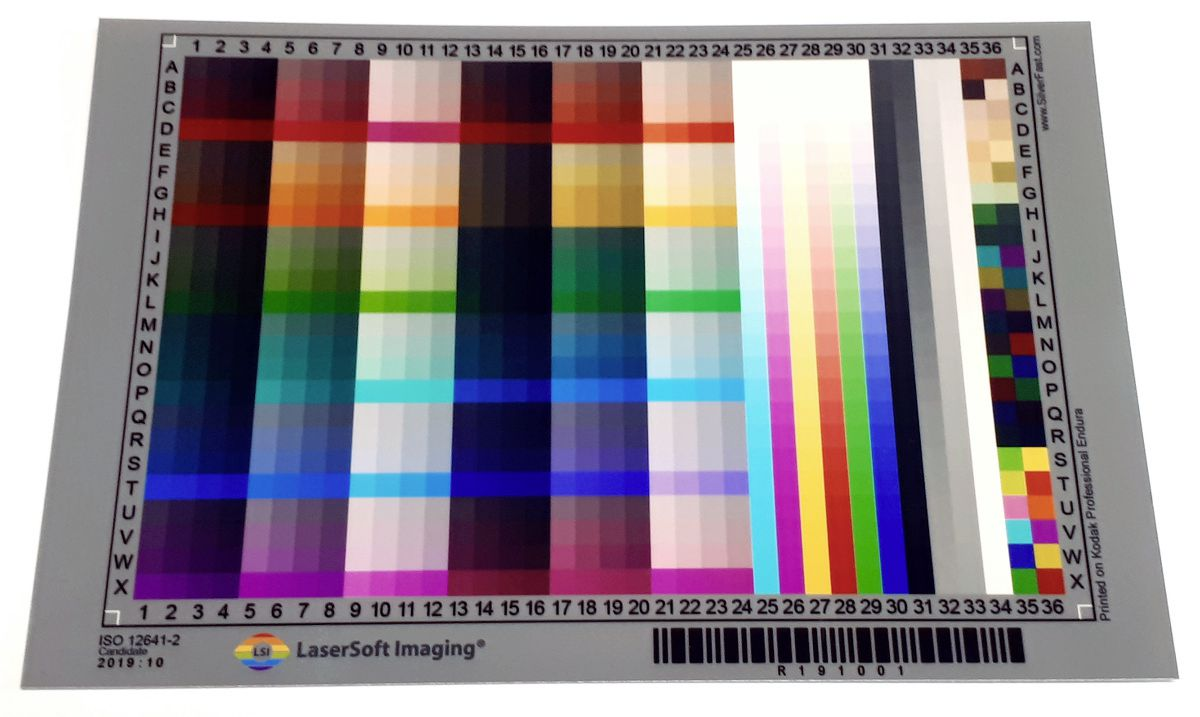
Advanced IT8 Target by LaserSoft Imaging

== Products ==
The company's products can be classified into four different categories :

- SilverFast SE / SE Plus / Ai Studio (Scanner Software)
- SilverFast HDR / HDR Studio (64Bit / 48 Bit Image Processing Software)
- SilverFast Archive Suite / Archive Suite SE
- SilverFast PrintTao 8 (Software for large format printers)
- SRDx Photoshop Plug-in (Dust and Scratch Removal)
- LaserSoft Imaging has also been manufacturing reflective and transparent IT8 Targets (ISO 12641-1), Advanced IT8 Targets (ISO 12641-2) since 2019.
- The Resolution Target (USAF 1951) is a tool to determine the maximum resolution of a particular scanner.
