= Index of infrared articles =

This is a list of infrared topics.

== A ==
- ADONIS: ADaptive Optics Near Infrared System
- ALICE (accelerator)
- Accretion disc
- Advanced Tactical Airborne Reconnaissance System
- Afocal system
- Air-to-air missile
- Anti-ship missile
- Applied spectroscopy
- Atmospheric Infrared Sounder

== B ==
- Bipolar outflow
- Blackbody infrared radiative dissociation
- Black silicon
- Blue Sky navigation pod

== C ==
- Calorescence
- Camera trap
- Capnography
- Carbon dioxide sensor
- Ceramic heater
- Charge-coupled device
- Chemical imaging
- Chemical laser
- Circular dichroism
- Circumstellar dust
- Civil Aircraft Missile Protection System
- Cloud albedo
- Cloud feedback
- Cold shield
- Color confinement
- Combat Identification Panel
- Common Infrared Countermeasures program
- Computed tomography laser mammography
- Conveyor belt furnace
- Cooled infrared detector
- Coreshine
- Cosmic background radiation
- Cosmic dust
- Cutoff (physics), infrared cutoff

== D ==
- Dangerously irrelevant operator
- Dark nebula
- Dazzler (weapon)
- Dichroic filter
- Diffuse Infrared Background Experiment
- Digital ICE
- Digital infrared thermal imaging in health care
- Disco ball
- Draper point
- Driver's vision enhancer
- Driver Monitoring System

== E ==
- Electric eye
- Electromagnetic spectrum
- Electro-optical MASINT
- Event-related optical signal
- Exozodiacal dust

== F ==
- Fast INfrared Exoplanet Spectroscopy Survey Explorer
- Fiber focus infrared soldering
- Filter (optics)
- Forward looking infrared
- Free-space optical communication
- Functional near-infrared imaging

== G ==
- Galileo (spacecraft)
- Gamma-Ray Burst Optical/Near-Infrared Detector
- Gas detector
- Gas laser
- Glow stick
- Greenhouse
- Greenhouse effect

== H ==
- H band (infrared)
- HDRi (data format)
- Headlamp
- Heat therapy
- Hot mirror

== I ==
- Infra-red search and track
- Infrared
- Infrared Astronomy
- Infrared beam
- Infrared blaster
- Infrared camera
- Infrared cirrus
- Infrared cleaning
- Infrared countermeasure
- Infrared cut-off filter
- Infrared dark cloud
- Infrared Data Association
- Infrared Data Transmission
- Infrared decoy flare
- Infrared detector
- Infrared divergence
- Infrared dye
- Infrared excess
- Infrared fixed point
- Infrared gas analyzer
- Infrared grill
- Infrared heater
- Infrared homing
- Infrared horizon-scanning
- Infrared interactance
- Infrared lamp
- Infrared laser
- Infrared light
- Infrared mammography
- Infrared microscopy
- Infrared multiphoton dissociation
- Infrared open-path detector
- Infrared photography
- Infrared Physics and Technology
- Infrared point sensor
- Infrared Processing and Analysis Center
- Infrared reflective coating
- Infrared remote sensing
- Infrared sauna
- Infrared sensing in snakes
- Infrared sensing in vampire bats
- Infrared sensor
- Infrared Sightings
- Infrared signature
- Infrared slavery
- Infrared smoke
- Infrared soldering
- Infrared sources
- Infrared spectroscopy
- Infrared spectroscopy correlation table
- Infrared stealth
- Infrared telescope
- Infrared Telescope in Space
- Infrared vision
- Infrared window
- Interlock (engineering)
- Interplanetary dust cloud
- Intervalence charge transfer
- Ionic crystal
- Iris recognition

== J ==
- J band (infrared)

== K ==
- K band (infrared)
- Kodak High-Speed Infrared

== L ==
- L band (infrared)
- LaserSoft Imaging
- Laser Ablation Electrospray Ionization
- Laser pointer
- Lazer Tag
- LIDAR detector
- Light gun
- Linux infrared remote control
- List of largest infrared telescopes
- List of astronomical interferometers at visible and infrared wavelengths
- Littoral Airborne Sensor/Hyperspectral
- Loreal pit
- Low Altitude Navigation and Targeting Infrared for Night
- Luminous infrared galaxy
- Lyman-break galaxy

== M ==
- MPB mine
- Man-portable air-defense systems
- Mercury cadmium telluride
- Metamaterial cloaking #Invisibility cloaking at infrared frequencies
- Meteosat visible and infrared imager
- Mid-Infrared Advanced Chemical Laser
- Minimum resolvable temperature difference
- Mistral (missile)
- Mobile Infrared Transmitter
- Modulation transfer function (infrared imaging)
- Molecular cloud
- Molecular vibration

== N ==
- Nancy Grace Roman Space Telescope
- Nanoshell
- Near Field Infrared Experiment
- Near Infrared Camera and Multi-Object Spectrometer
- Near-Infrared Mapping Spectrometer
- Near-infrared signature management technology
- Near-infrared spectroscopy
- Near-infrared window in biological tissue
- Negative luminescence
- Net radiometer
- Non-ionizing radiation
- Nondispersive infrared sensor

== O ==
- OH-Suppressing Infrared Integral Field Spectrograph
- Optical, Spectroscopic, and Infrared Remote Imaging System (OSIRIS)
- Optical properties of water and ice
- Optical window
- Opto-isolator
- Outgoing longwave radiation

== P ==
- PASS device
- Photometer
- Photon upconversion
- Photosynthetically active radiation
- Photothermal therapy
- Planetary Fourier Spectrometer
- Polariton
- Projection keyboard

== Q ==
- Quantum cascade laser

== R ==
- RAPTOR
- Radiative flux
- Raman spectroscopy
- Reststrahlen effect
- RG equipment
- RIAS (Remote Infrared Audible Signage)
- Roboraptor

== S ==
- Shiva laser
- Signal transfer function
- Slide projector
- Soft-collinear effective theory
- Solar gain
- Space-Based Infrared System
- Space-Based Infrared Systems Wing
- Spitzer Infrared Nearby Galaxies Survey
- SPRITE infrared detector
- Stratoscope
- Stratospheric Observatory for Infrared Astronomy
- Structured light
- Super Scope
- Super black
- Surface plasmon polaritons
- Susceptor

== T ==
- Tail-chase engagement
- Television Infrared Observation Satellite
- The Infra-Red Traffic Logger
- Thermal Emission Spectrometer
- Thermal emittance
- Thermal imaging camera (firefighting)
- Thermal infrared spectroscopy
- Thermofax
- Thermographic camera
- Thermophotovoltaic
- Thermopile
- TrackIR
- Transferability (chemistry)
- Transparency and translucency
- Trombe wall
- Tropical Rainfall Measuring Mission
- Tropospheric Emission Spectrometer
- Two-dimensional infrared spectroscopy
- Two-Micron Sky Survey

== U ==
- UKIRT Infrared Deep Sky Survey
- Unidentified Infrared Emission (UIE)

== V ==
- Van der Waals molecule
- Vertical-external-cavity surface-emitting-laser
- Vibrational circular dichroism
- Vibronic transition
- Visible and near-infrared
- Visible and Infrared Survey Telescope for Astronomy
- VS-17

== W ==
- Wood's glass
