= Conveyor belt furnace =

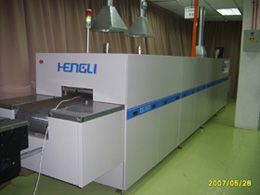
A typical conveyor belt furnace.

A conveyor belt furnace is a furnace that uses a conveyor or belt to carry process parts or material through a primary heating chamber for rapid thermal processing. It is designed for fast drying and curing of products, and has widespread use in the firing process of thick film and metallization process of solar cell manufacturing. Other names for conveyor belt furnace include metallization furnace, belt furnace, atmosphere furnace, infrared furnace and fast fire furnace.

Conveyor furnaces typically adopt a tunnel structure and contain multiple controlled zones including preheating, binder burn out, heating, firing, and cooling. A conveyor furnace also features fast thermal responses, uniform and stable temperature distribution. Some can heat treated parts to around 1050 °C. The belt speed of a conveyor furnace can be as high as to 6000 mm/min. Products are heated efficiently by infrared radiation (a furnace can also use ceramic heaters or IR lamps) and are dried and fired after passing through the controlled zones, followed by rapid cooling.

== Process applications ==
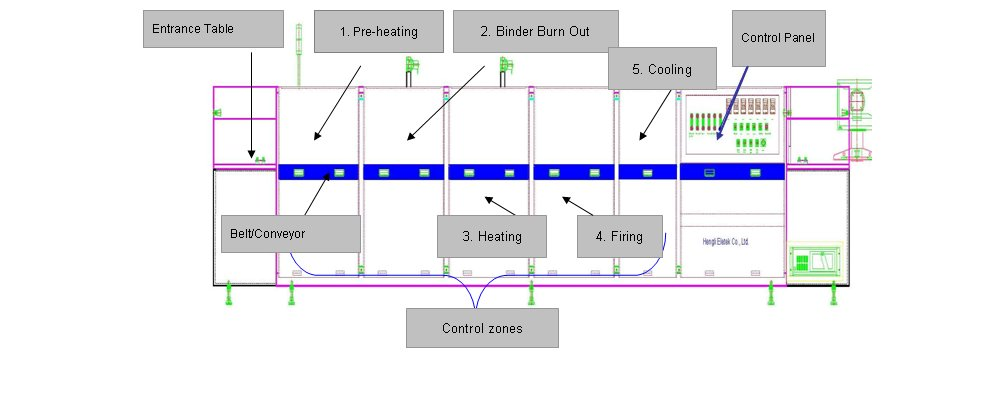

=== Thick film processing ===
After a paste is screened onto a substrate and it settles for 5–15 minutes at room temperature, it undergoes oven drying at 100-150 °C for 10–15 minutes to remove solvents. Firing is then completed in conveyor belt furnaces at temperatures between 500 and 1000 °C.

=== Crystalline silicon solar cell Manufacturing ===
Electrical contacts are usually formed by screen printing. The firing is done in conveyor belt furnaces at a temperature of about 700 °C for a few minutes. Upon firing, the organic solvents evaporate and the metal powder becomes a conducting path for the electric current.

=== Thin film solar cell manufacturing ===
A transparent conducting glass, coated with doped SnO_{2} or ITO film, is used as a substrate. A thin film, such as CdS, is then deposited through CSS or CBD techniques. The CdS film is heat treated by a conveyor belt furnace in a reducing atmosphere or in the presence of CdCl_{2} at 400-500 °C.

=== Dye-sensitized solar cell (DSSC) manufacturing ===
TiO_{2} nanoparticles have been used extensively to increase the interfacial surface area in dye-sensitized solar cells. Nanoparticle films are generally made by screen printing a paste of titania nanocrystals and then sintering the particles together at 450-500 °C in a conveyor belt furnace.
