= DVE =

DVE or Dve may refer to:

- Digital video effect, transitions from one screen to another
- Domestic violent extremist, a type of person involved in home-grown violent extremism
- Duck Viral Enteritis (Duck plague) a high mortality, very virulent, highly transmissible disease
- Driver's Vision Enhancer, compound viewing system used to enhance a driver's viewing capabilities during degraded visual conditions
- WDVE, a radio station in Pittsburgh, Pennsylvania
- De vulgari eloquentia, an essay by Dante Alighieri on the relationship between Latin and vernacular
- Dvĕ vdovy, The Two Widows, a two-act Czech opera by Bedřich Smetana.

== See also ==
- DVA (disambiguation)
