= RG equipment =

The RG equipment / Tabby Infrared was an infrared signaling device used by British Commandos. The device operated by using a special lamp and received on a screen in a box similar to that of a camera. It was top secret until declassified in March 1944.

== See also ==
- Index of infrared articles
