= WDVA (disambiguation) =

WDVA may refer to:

- WDVA (1250 AM), Danville, Virginia, USA; a radio station using callsign DVA in region W
- Wisconsin Department of Veterans Affairs (WDVA, DVA, VA), Wisconsin, USA; a department of the government of the state of Wisconsin
- United States District Court for the Western District of Virginia (WDVA, W.D.Va., WD-Va), Virginia, USA; a U.S. federal court district for the western part of the state of Virginia
- WDVA 200, a 1983 motorsports race in South Boston, Virginia, USA

== See also ==
- DVA (disambiguation)
- KDVA, callsign DVA in region K
