= Littoral Airborne Sensor/Hyperspectral =

The Littoral Airborne Sensor/Hyperspectral (LASH) imaging system developed by the United States Navy combines optical imaging hardware, navigation and stabilization, and advanced image processing and algorithms to provide real-time submarine target detection, classification, and identification in littoral waters. Operating in visible and near infrared spectrum (390 to 710 nm), LASH collects hyperspectral imagery using many spectral channels (colors) to exploit subtle color features associated with targets of interest. Developed as a pod-mounted system, LASH can be operated from a P-3C Orion, SH-60B Seahawk, or other platforms in support of anti-submarine warfare, mine detection, passive bathymetry, near-shore mapping, and land-based detection, discrimination and targeting.

== Other applications ==
LASH technology might have medical applications. Researchers are investigating the camera's ability to detect cancer cells by comparing their minute light variations with surrounding tissue. Its ability to detect cervical cancer has been studied. If successful, it could perform a painless virtual biopsy and provide instantaneous results.
