= Dangerously irrelevant operator =

Class of operators in quantum field theory

In statistical mechanics and quantum field theory, a dangerously irrelevant operator (or dangerous irrelevant operator) is an operator which is irrelevant at a renormalization group fixed point, yet affects the infrared (IR) physics significantly (e.g. because the vacuum expectation value (VEV) of some field depends sensitively upon the coefficient of this operator).

== Critical phenomena ==
In the theory of critical phenomena, free energy of a system near the critical point depends analytically on the coefficients of generic (not dangerous) irrelevant operators, while the dependence on the coefficients of dangerously irrelevant operators is non-analytic ( p. 49).

The presence of dangerously irrelevant operators leads to the violation of the hyperscaling relation $\alpha=2-d\nu$ between the critical exponents $\alpha$ and $\nu$ in $d$ dimensions. The simplest example ( p. 93) is the critical point of the Ising ferromagnet in $d\ge4$ dimensions, which is a gaussian theory (free massless scalar $\phi$), but the leading irrelevant perturbation $\phi^4$ is dangerously irrelevant. Another example occurs for the Ising model with random-field disorder, where the fixed point occurs at zero temperature, and the temperature perturbation is dangerously irrelevant ( p. 164).

== Quantum field theory ==
Let us suppose there is a field $\phi$ with a potential depending upon two parameters, $a$ and $b$.

$$V\left(\phi\right)=-a \phi^\alpha + b\phi^\beta$$

Let us also suppose that $a$ is positive and nonzero and $\beta$ > $\alpha$. If $b$ is zero, there is no stable equilibrium. If the scaling dimension of $\phi$ is $c$, then the scaling dimension of $b$ is $d-\beta c$ where $d$ is the number of dimensions. It is clear that if the scaling dimension of $b$ is negative, $b$ is an irrelevant parameter. However, the crucial point is, that the VEV

$$\langle\phi\rangle=\left(\frac{a\alpha}{b\beta}\right)^{\frac{1}{\beta-\alpha}}=\left(\frac{a\alpha}{\beta}\right)^{\frac{1}{\beta-\alpha}}b^{-\frac{1}{\beta-\alpha}}$$.

depends very sensitively upon $b$, at least for small values of $b$. Because the nature of infrared physics also depends upon the VEV, it looks very different even for a tiny change in $b$ not because the physics in the vicinity of $\phi=0$ changes much — it hardly changes at all — but because the VEV we are expanding about has changed enormously.

Supersymmetric models with a modulus can often have dangerously irrelevant parameters.

== Other uses of the term ==
Consider a renormalization group (RG) flow triggered at short distances by a relevant perturbation of an ultra-violet (UV) fixed point, and flowing at long distances to an infra-red (IR) fixed point. It may be possible (e.g. in perturbation theory) to monitor how dimensions of UV operators change along the RG flow. In such a situation, one sometimes calls dangerously irrelevant a UV operator whose scaling dimension, while irrelevant at short distances: $\Delta_{\rm UV}>d$ , receives a negative correction along a renormalization group flow, so that the operator becomes relevant at long distances: $\Delta_{\rm IR}<d$. This usage of the term is different from the one originally introduced in statistical physics.
