= Infrared spectroscopy correlation table =

Table listing infrared absorption peaks for various bonds

An infrared spectroscopy correlation table (or table of infrared absorption frequencies) is a list of absorption peaks and frequencies, typically reported in wavenumber, for common types of molecular bonds and functional groups. In physical and analytical chemistry, infrared spectroscopy (IR spectroscopy) is a technique used to identify chemical compounds based on the way infrared radiation is absorbed by the compound.

The absorptions in this range do not apply only to bonds in organic molecules. IR spectroscopy is useful when it comes to analysis of inorganic compounds (such as metal complexes or fluoromanganates) as well.

== Group frequencies ==
Tables of vibrational transitions of stable and transient molecules are also available.

Bond	Type of bond	Specific type of bond	Absorption peak (cm^{−1})	Appearance
C─H	alkyl	methyl	1260	strong
C─H	alkyl	methyl	1380	weak
C─H	alkyl	methyl	2870	medium to strong
C─H	alkyl	methyl	2960	medium to strong
C─H	alkyl	methylene	1470	strong
C─H	alkyl	methylene	2850	medium to strong
C─H	alkyl	methylene	2925	medium to strong
C─H	alkyl	methine	2890	weak
C─H	vinyl	C═CH_{2}	900	strong
C─H	vinyl	C═CH_{2}	2975	medium
C─H	vinyl	C═CH_{2}	3080	medium
C─H	vinyl	C═CH	3020	medium
C─H	vinyl	monosubstituted alkenes	900	strong
C─H	vinyl	monosubstituted alkenes	990	strong
C─H	vinyl	cis-disubstituted alkenes	670–700	strong
C─H	vinyl	trans-disubstituted alkenes	965	strong
C─H	vinyl	trisubstituted alkenes	800–840	strong to medium
C─H	aromatic	benzene/sub. benzene	3070	weak
C─H	aromatic	monosubstituted benzene	700–750	strong
C─H	aromatic	monosubstituted benzene	690–710	strong
C─H	aromatic	ortho-disub. benzene	750	strong
C─H	aromatic	meta-disub. benzene	750–800	strong
C─H	aromatic	meta-disub. benzene	860–900	strong
C─H	aromatic	para-disub. benzene	800–860	strong
C─H	alkynes	any	3300	medium
C─H	aldehydes	any	2720	medium
C─H	aldehydes	any	2820	medium
C═C	acyclic C═C	monosub. alkenes	1645	medium
C═C	acyclic C═C	1,1-disub. alkenes	1655	medium
C═C	acyclic C═C	cis-1,2-disub. alkenes	1660	medium
C═C	acyclic C═C	trans-1,2-disub. alkenes	1675	medium
C═C	acyclic C═C	trisub., tetrasub. alkenes	1670	weak
C═C	conjugated C═C	dienes	1600	strong
C═C	conjugated C═C	dienes	1650	strong
C═C	with benzene ring	dienes	1625	strong
C═C	with C═O	dienes	1600	strong
C═C	C═C (both sp^{2})	any	1640–1680	medium
C═C	aromatic C═C	any	1450	weak to strong (usually 3 or 4)
C═C	aromatic C═C	any	1500	weak to strong (usually 3 or 4)
C═C	aromatic C═C	any	1580	weak to strong (usually 3 or 4)
C═C	aromatic C═C	any	1600	weak to strong (usually 3 or 4)
C═C	C≡C	terminal alkynes	2100–2140	weak
C═C	C≡C	disubst. alkynes	2190–2260	very weak (often indistinguishable)
C=O	aldehyde/ketone	saturated aliph./cyclic 6-membered	1720	
C=O	aldehyde/ketone	α,β-unsaturated	1685	
C=O	aldehyde/ketone	aromatic ketones	1685	
C=O	aldehyde/ketone	cyclic 5-membered	1750	
C=O	aldehyde/ketone	cyclic 4-membered	1775	
C=O	aldehyde/ketone	aldehydes	1725	influenced by conjugation (as with ketones)
C=O	carboxylic acids/derivates	saturated carboxylic acids	1710	
C=O	carboxylic acids/derivates	unsat./aromatic carb. acids	1680–1690	
C=O	carboxylic acids/derivates	esters and lactones	1735	influenced by conjugation and ring size (as with ketones)
C=O	carboxylic acids/derivates	anhydrides	1760	
C=O	carboxylic acids/derivates	anhydrides	1820	
C=O	carboxylic acids/derivates	acyl halides	1800	
C=O	carboxylic acids/derivates	amides	1650	associated amides
C=O	carboxylic acids/derivates	carboxylates (salts)	1550–1610	
C=O	carboxylic acids/derivates	amino acid zwitterions	1550–1610	
O─H	alcohols, phenols	low concentration	3610–3670	
O─H	alcohols, phenols	high concentration	3200–3400	broad
O─H	carboxylic acids	low concentration	3500–3560	
O─H	carboxylic acids	high concentration	3000	broad
N─H	primary amines	any	3400–3500	strong
N─H	primary amines	any	1560–1640	strong
N─H	secondary amines	any	>3000	weak to medium
N─H	ammonium ions	any	2400–3200	multiple broad peaks
C─O	alcohols	primary	1040–1060	strong, broad
C─O	alcohols	secondary	~1100	strong
C─O	alcohols	tertiary	1150–1200	medium
C─O	phenols	any	1200	
C─O	ethers	aliphatic	1120	
C─O	ethers	aromatic	1220–1260	
C─O	carboxylic acids	any	1250–1300	
C─O	esters	any	1100–1300	two bands (distinct from ketones, which do not possess a C─O bond)
C─N	aliphatic amines	any	1020–1220	often overlapped
C─N	C═N	any	1615–1700	similar conjugation effects to C═O
C─N	C≡N (nitriles)	unconjugated	2250	medium
C─N	C≡N (nitriles)	conjugated	2230	medium
C─N	R─N─C (isocyanides)	any	2165–2110	
C─N	R─N═C═S (isothiocyanates)	any	2140–1990	
C─X	fluoroalkanes	ordinary	1000–1100	
C─X	fluoroalkanes	trifluoromethyl	1100–1200	two strong, broad bands
C─X	chloroalkanes	any	540–760	weak to medium
C─X	bromoalkanes	any	500–600	medium to strong
C─X	iodoalkanes	any	500	medium to strong
N─O	nitro compounds	aliphatic	1540	stronger
N─O	nitro compounds	aliphatic	1380	weaker
N─O	nitro compounds	aromatic	1520	lower if conjugated
N─O	nitro compounds	aromatic	1350	lower if conjugated
P─C	Organophosphorus compound	aromatic	1440-1460	medium
P─O	phosphorus oxide	bonded	1195-1250	strong
P─O	phosphorus oxide	free	1250-1300	strong

== See also ==
- Applied spectroscopy
- Absorption spectroscopy
