= OH-Suppressing Infrared Integral Field Spectrograph =

OSIRIS (OH-Suppressing Infrared Integral Field Spectrograph) is an integral field spectrograph for the Keck I telescope in Hawaii. As an integral field spectrograph, it can obtain many spectra simultaneously covering a small region of the sky. As such, it combines the capabilities of a traditional spectrograph and a regular imaging camera. The 'OH suppressing' portion of the name refers to the fact that OSIRIS has sufficient spectral resolution that sky glow from OH molecules can be separated and removed from the spectra of the science targets. OSIRIS covers an infrared bandpass from 1 to 2.5 micrometers with a spectral resolution of about 3800. Combined with the Keck laser guide star adaptive optics system, it can obtain diffraction-limited observations on extremely faint targets. OSIRIS was developed by the UCLA Infrared Laboratory under professor James Larkin. OSIRIS achieved first light on February 22, 2005, on the Keck II telescope.

On April 29, 2005, OSIRIS was used to observe an infrared flare associated with Sgr A*. This was its first observation results. OSIRIS was moved to Keck I in January, 2012. While the instrument proved scientifically useful, it was limited by a subpar grating. A new grating was installed in 2013, which improved sensitivity by a factor of 1.83.
