= Infrared vision =

Infrared vision or thermal vision may refer to:

- Thermography, a process where a thermal camera captures and creates an image of an object by using infrared radiation emitted from the object in a process
- Thermoception, the sensation and perception of temperature
- Night vision, the ability to see in low-light conditions, either naturally with scotopic vision or through a night-vision device
