= Infrared sauna =

Nontraditional type of sauna for which pseudoscientific claims are made

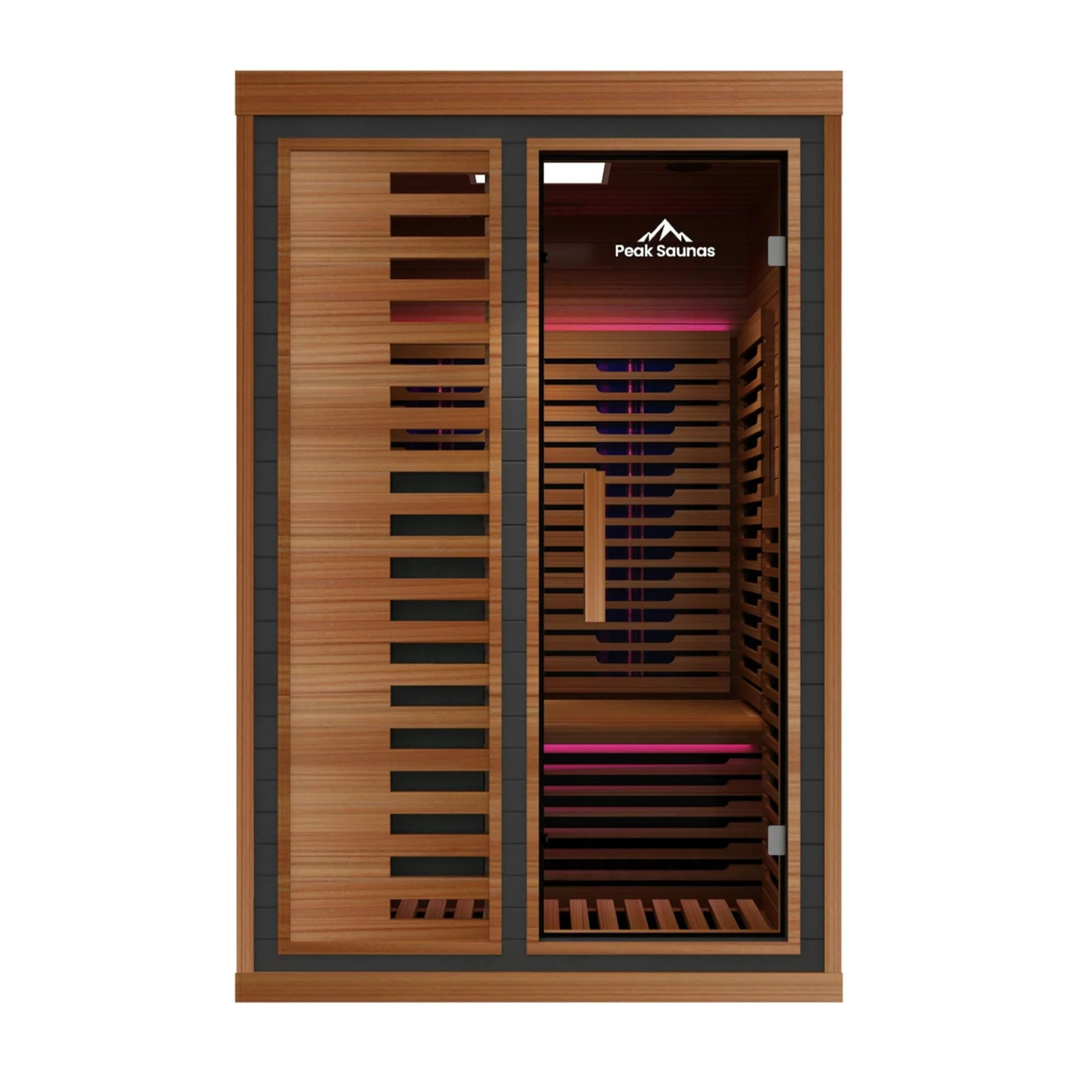
- Infrared sauna made of cedar wood
- Inventor(s): John Harvey Kellogg
- Invention date: 1891
- [edit on Wikidata]

An infrared sauna uses infrared heaters to emit infrared light experienced as radiant heat which is absorbed by the surface of the skin. Infrared saunas are popular in alternative therapies, where they are claimed to help with a number of medical issues including autism, cancer, and COVID-19, but these claims are entirely pseudoscientific. Traditional saunas differ from infrared saunas in that they heat the body primarily by conduction and convection from the heated air and by radiation of the heated surfaces in the sauna room whereas infrared saunas primarily use just radiation.

Infrared saunas are also used in Infrared Therapy and Waon Therapy; while there is a small amount of preliminary evidence that these therapies correlate with a number of benefits, including reduced blood pressure, increased heart rate and increased left ventricular function, there are several problems with linking this evidence to alleged health benefits.

== History ==
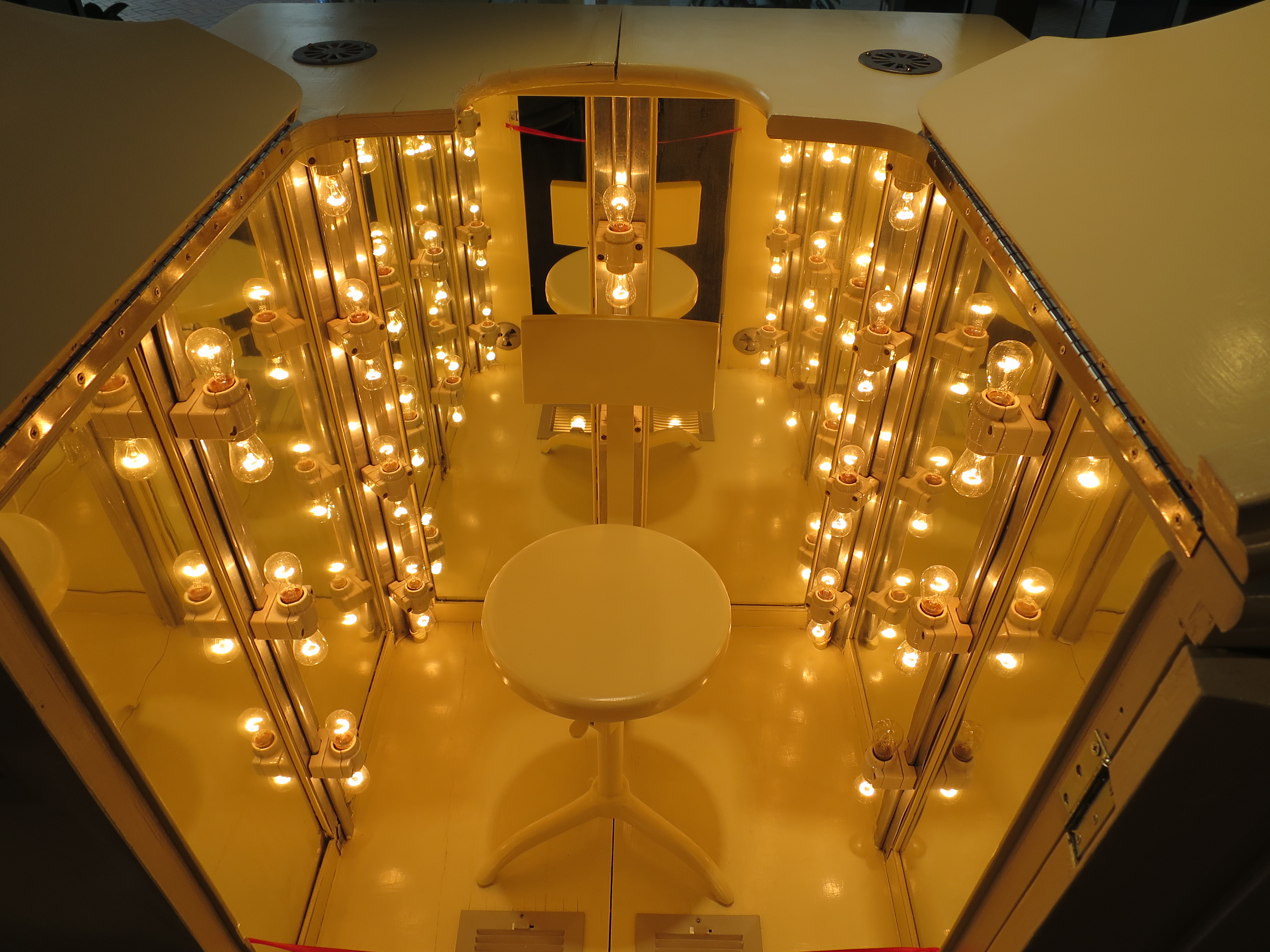
Radiant heat bath by John H. Kellogg at the USPTO museum

John Harvey Kellogg invented the use of radiant heat saunas with his incandescent electric light bath in 1891. He claimed that it stimulated healing in the body and in 1893 displayed his invention at the Chicago World's Fair. In 1896 the Radiant Heat Bath was patented by Kellogg and described in the patent as not depending on the heat in the air to heat the body but able to more quickly produce a sweat than traditional Turkish or Russian baths at a lower ambient temperature. The idea became popular, particularly in Germany where "Light Institutes" were set up. King Edward VII of England and Kaiser Wilhelm II of Germany both had radiant heat baths set up in their various palaces. The modern concept of the infrared sauna was revived in the 1970s in Japan as Waon (Japanese: "soothing warmth") Therapy and neonatal beds for newborns use infrared elements to keep the baby warm without being stifled.

== Description ==
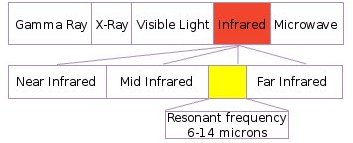
Electromagnetic Far Infrared

Infrared saunas can be designed to look like traditional saunas but cheaper models can be in the form of a tent with an infrared element inside. Infrared saunas differ from other types of sauna such as traditional Finnish saunas mainly in the method of heat delivery. Far infrared light, which is emitted in an infrared sauna at a wavelength of around 10 μm, is felt directly by the body in the form of radiated heat without the need to heat the air around the body first. This results in a lower ambient air temperature allowing for longer sustained stays in the sauna. Infrared light also penetrates the body deeply resulting in a fast and vigorous sweat being produced. The average ambient temperature in an infrared sauna is usually 40–60 °C (104–140 °F) compared to 70–90 °C (158–194 °F) in traditional saunas.

== Effects ==
A 2009 literature review of research on far-infrared saunas (FIRS) concluded that there was limited moderate evidence supporting their efficacy in normalizing blood pressure and treating congestive heart failure. The review found fair evidence from a single study supporting FIRS therapy for chronic pain. They found fair evidence against claims that FIRS reduces cholesterol levels. They found weak evidence, from a single study, supporting FIRS therapy as treatment for obesity. All of the studies in the review were limited: they were small sample sizes, short duration, unvalidated symptom scales, and were conducted by the same core research group.

In February 2021 Steven Novella of Science-Based Medicine commented on the quality of studies in an article entitled "Infrared Saunas for 'Detoxification'" he stated that:

Most of the mainstream attention is on the cardiovascular effects. Using a sauna does correlate with reduced blood pressure (in some, BP may also increase), increased heart rate, increased dermal perfusion with a reduction in organ perfusion, and increased left ventricular function and arterial flexibility. There are several problems with linking this evidence to alleged health benefits. First – these effects are all short term, during the sauna and for 30 minutes following. We don't know if there is any sustained change in cardiovascular function. Second, we don't know that these changes are improvements. This relates to the third issue, it is possible that at least most of these changes may simply be due to dehydration. Reduced blood volume from water loss (similar to a diuretic effect) will reduce the blood pressure and increase the heart rate, relaxing blood vessels to increase perfusion. So perhaps all we are seeing is a transient effect of the dehydration that accompanies using a sauna.

A 2018 systematic review and meta-analysis of nine clinical trials found that five weekly conventional sauna sessions for 2 to 4 weeks was associated with a significant reduction in brain natriuretic peptide (BNP; a marker of heart failure progression) and cardiothoracic ratio (an indicator of heart enlargement), and improved left-ventricular ejection fraction, but no significant effect on left-ventricular end-diastolic diameter, left atrial diameter, systolic blood pressure, or diastolic blood pressure. The review also rated the quality of evidence for these findings as moderate to insufficient, citing a risk of bias and imprecision as the reason for the low evidence rating. The evidence presented by the review supported a therapeutic effect of sauna bathing for heart failure patients but recommended that further studies were needed to be able to draw definitive conclusions.

A 2019 scientific survey found that most people use both infrared and traditional saunas for relaxation and that its use, 5 to 15 times per month, was associated with higher mental well-being.

== Use in alternative therapies ==
There are a number of claims made about the health effects of infrared saunas that are entirely based in pseudoscience and have no evidence to support them.

=== Claims of detoxification ===
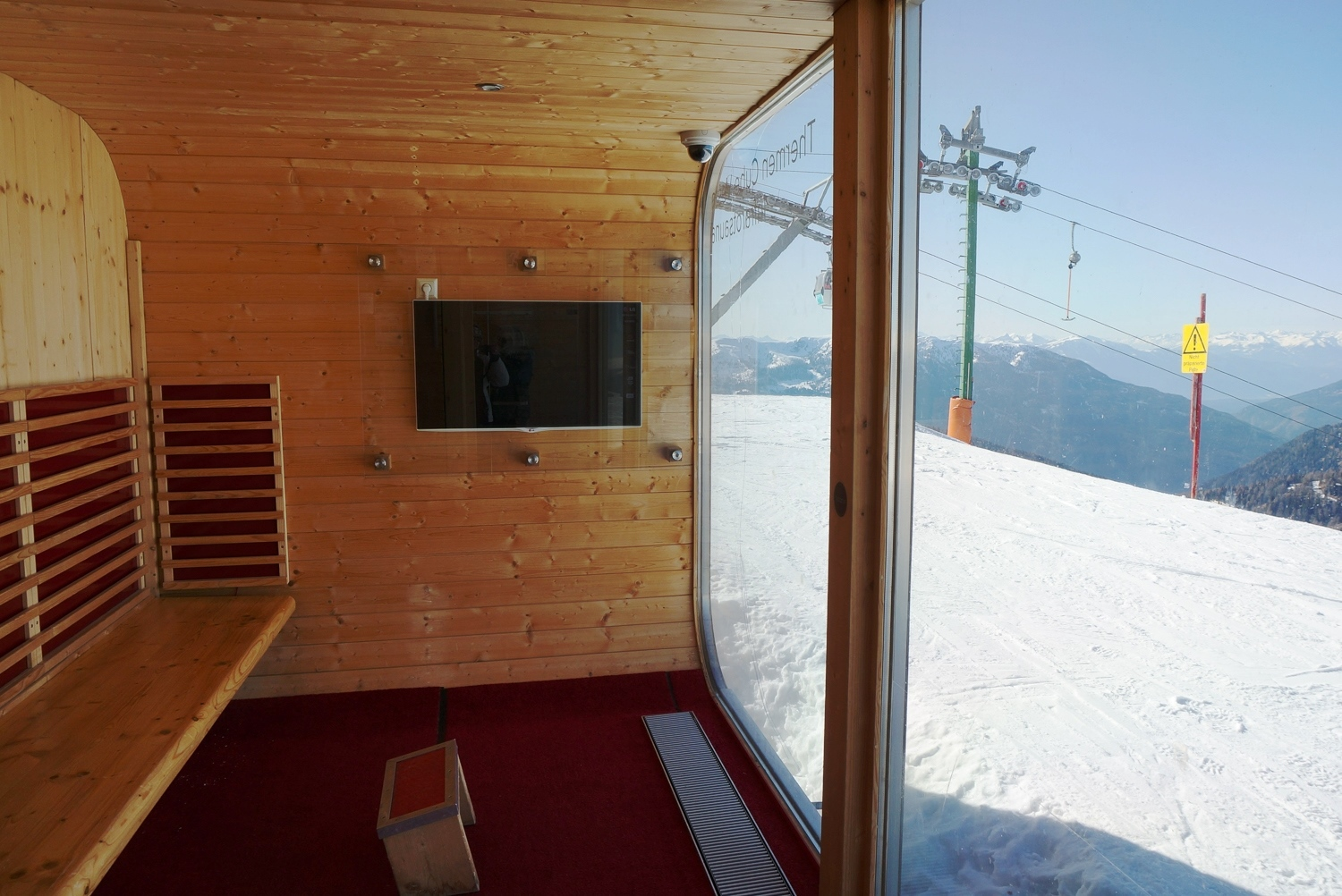
At the height of the Kaiserburg (2039 m above sea level), the infrared sauna "Thermen Cube Vesta" is directly on the ski slope for warming up. It is located in the Nockberge, municipality Bad Kleinkirchheim, Carinthia, Austria, EU.

Proponents of infrared saunas may, without evidence, advertise benefits of detoxification, or that infrared saunas detoxify to a greater extent than traditional saunas. Proponents of infrared saunas will often claim that because infrared light penetrates the body so deeply, it must detoxify better than other means of sweat induction. Infrared saunas do induce body warmth and sweat much more vigorously and at lower ambient temperatures than traditional saunas or exercise; this does not mean that they detoxify more efficiently, or at all. Sweating removes an insignificant amount of toxins from the body and can be counterproductive to the function of the body's actual detoxification system, the liver and kidneys. Producing more sweat reduces the amount of urine produced by the body, which may actually reduce toxin excretion.

=== Applications ===
Fire departments in Texas and Indiana have purchased infrared saunas under the premise that they will prevent cancer and that the firefighters will be able to sweat out inhaled pollutants. Alternative therapists such as naturopaths have advised the use of infrared saunas for the treatment of cancer and autism. Wellness clinics have recommended it to remove radiation and heavy metals from the body, as well as a preventative treatment for COVID-19. Gwyneth Paltrow has also been criticised by experts for recommending infrared saunas as a post COVID-19 treatment.

== See also ==
- Balneotherapy
- Bikram Yoga
- Chelation therapy
- Chromotherapy
- Detoxification (alternative medicine)
- Detoxification foot baths
- Electromagnetic spectrum
- Light therapy
- Niels Ryberg Finsen
- Sauna
