= Infrared lamp =

Infrared lamps are electrical devices which emit infrared radiation. Infrared lamps are commonly used in radiant heating for industrial processes and building heating. Infrared LEDs are used for communication over optical fibers and in remote control devices. Infrared lamps are also used for some night vision devices where visible light would be objectionable. Infrared lamp sources are used in certain scientific and industrial instrument for chemical analysis of liquids and gases; for example, the pollutant sulfur dioxide in air can be measured using its infrared absorption characteristics. IR radiant energy emitted by lamps cover a wide spectrum of wavelengths, ranging from 0.7 μm (micrometers) to a longer wavelength of 400 μm.

== Types ==
Incandescent light bulbs use a tungsten filament heated to high temperature to produce visible light and, necessarily, even more infrared radiation. Round bulbs, often tinted red to reduce visible light, provide infrared radiant heat suitable for warming of people or animals, but the power density available is low. The development of quartz halogen linear lamps allowed much higher power density up to 200 watts/inch of lamp (8 w/mm), useful for industrial heating, drying and processing applications. By adjusting the voltage applied to incandescent lamps, the spectrum of the radiated energy can be made to reduce visible light and emphasize infrared energy production. Different wavelengths of infrared radiation are differently absorbed by different materials.

Some applications use the heat generated by the standard incandescent lamps, such as incubators, brooding boxes for poultry, heat lights for reptile tanks, novelty lamps such as lava lamps, and the Easy-Bake Oven toy. Heat lamps may have a red coating to reduce the visible light emitted.

Solid-state light emitting diodes can be produced to be efficient sources of near-monochromatic infrared energy. Such sources can be rapidly modulated for communication systems and control signals. A light emitting diode can be closely coupled to an optical fiber, allowing infrared signals to be sent up to scores of kilometres without amplification.

== Heating ==
Infrared heating uses infrared lamps, commonly called heat lamps, to transmit infrared radiation to the body that is being heated. When a body with a large surface area needs to be heated, an array of infrared lamps is often used. The lamp commonly contains an incandescent bulb that produces infrared radiation. Infrared lamps have many industrial applications including curing coatings and preparing plastic for forming, commercial applications such as cooking and browning food, and personal applications such as providing heat (especially in bathrooms and for pets) as well as for commercial and industrial heating.

== Communication ==
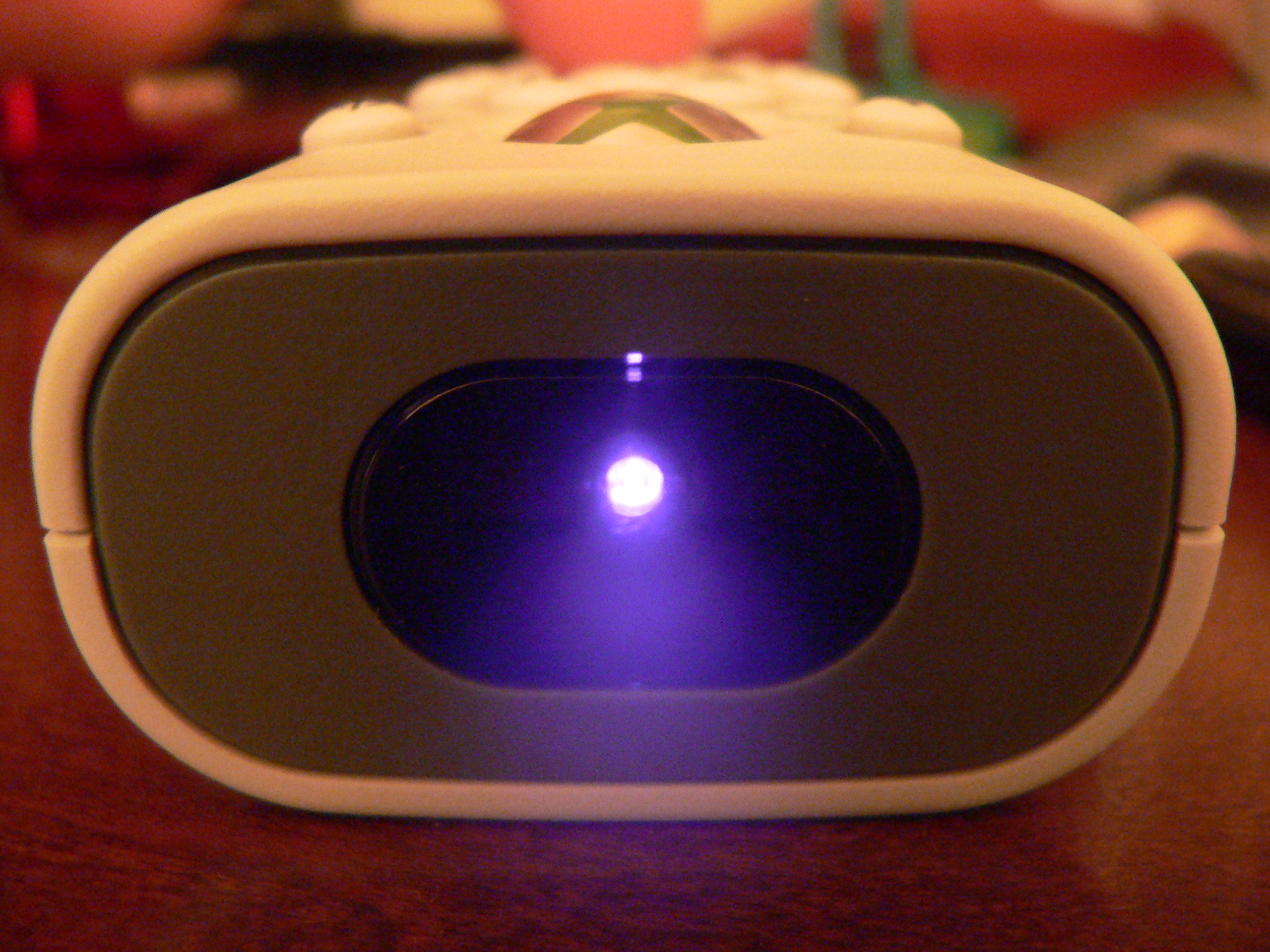
Infrared light from the LED of a remote control as seen by a digital camera.

IR data transmission is also employed in short-range communication among computer peripherals and personal digital assistants. These devices usually conform to standards published by IrDA, the Infrared Data Association. Remote controls and IrDA devices use infrared light-emitting diodes (LEDs) to emit infrared radiation which is focused by a plastic lens into a narrow beam. The beam is modulated, i.e. switched on and off, to encode the data. The receiver uses a silicon photodiode to convert the infrared radiation to an electric current. It responds only to the rapidly pulsing signal created by the transmitter, and filters out slowly changing infrared radiation from ambient light. Infrared communications are useful for indoor use in areas of high population density. IR does not penetrate walls and so does not interfere with other devices in adjoining rooms. Infrared is the most common way for remote controls to command appliances.

== See also ==
- Infrared communications applications
