= Remote infrared audible signage =

Remote infrared audible signage (RIAS) was developed by Smith-Kettlewell Eye Research Institute (as Talking Signs^{R}) so that print-disabled people, such as those that are blind or have low-vision, or are illiterate, foreign, or visually impaired, would be able to access the same type of information available through textual print signs within the built environment.

== Overview ==
It consists of infrared transmitters repeatedly sending encoded spoken versions of the contents of the sign through Wireless communication. An early version in 1979 called "Talking Lights" has been successfully upgraded/marketed commercially as "Talking Signs" which are being globally installed.

An associated handheld or glasses-mounted IR receiver is directionally sensitive to a direct, line-of-sight infrared light beam and orients the person by giving more positive feedback when the sign is being pointed to directly and is close.

The system has been tested and works effectively in both interior and exterior settings and does not disturb those environments because the IR beams are invisible and silent.

The principle of Alexander Graham Bell's photophone led to development of devices capable of transmitting/decoding infrared waves in systems ranging from military communications through remote control systems for televisions and computers.

== Standardization ==
RIAS features in US building code 703.7. This is quoted in a report for the U.S. Access Board as follows:

- 703.7.1 General: Remote Infra red Audible Sign Systems shall comply with Section 703.7.
- 703.7.2 Transmitters: Where provided, Remote Infra red Audible Sign Transmitters shall be designed to communicate with receivers complying with Section 703.7.3.
- 703.7.3 Remote Infra red Audible Sign Receivers.
- 703.7.3.1 Frequency: Basic speech messages shall be frequency modulated at 25 kHz, with a +/– 2.5 kHz deviation, and shall have an infra red wave length from 850 to 950 nanometer (nm).
- 703.7.3.2 Optical Power Density: Receiver shall produce a 12 decibel (dB) signal–plus–noise–to–noise ratio with a 1 kHz modulation tone at +/– 2.5 kHz deviation of the 25 kHz subcarrier at an optical power density of 26 picowatts per square millimeter measured at the receiver photosensor aperture.
- 703.7.3.3 Audio Out-put: The audio out-put from an internal speaker shall be at 75 dBA minimum at 18 inches (455 mm) with a maximum distortion of 10%.
- 703.7.3.4 Reception Range: The receiver shall be designed for a high dynamic range and capable of operating in full sun background illumination.
- 703.7.3.5 Multiple Signals: A receiver provided for the capture of the stronger of two signals in the receiver field of view shall provide a received power ratio on the order of 20 dB for negligible interference.
