= DVA =

DVA, dva or D.VA may refer to:

== Finance ==
- Debit Valuation Adjustment, one of the X-Value Adjustments in relation to derivative instruments held by banks
- Debt valuation adjustment, valuation on corporation's publicly traded debt impacts corporation's earnings
- Dollar Value Averaging, a technique of adding to an investment portfolio

== Music ==
- Clock DVA, an industrial, post-punk and EBM group
- DVA (band) (stylised form: DVA) a Czech musical duo
- DVA Music, a record label
- DVAS, an electronic dance music group
- Dva (album) (stylised form: DVA), a 2013 music album by electronic artist Emika
- Scratcha DVA, an electronic musician, producer and DJ

== Other uses ==
- Defence Vetting Agency, former name of DBS National Security Vetting, a unit in the Defence Business Services of the U.K.
- Developmental venous anomaly, a congenital variant of the cerebral venous drainage
- Driver and Vehicle Agency of Northern Ireland, UK
- D.Va, a character in the first-person shooter game Overwatch
- Digital variance angiography, an image processing method used in medical imaging

== See also ==
- Department of Veterans Affairs
