= Ceramic heater =

Consumer space heater

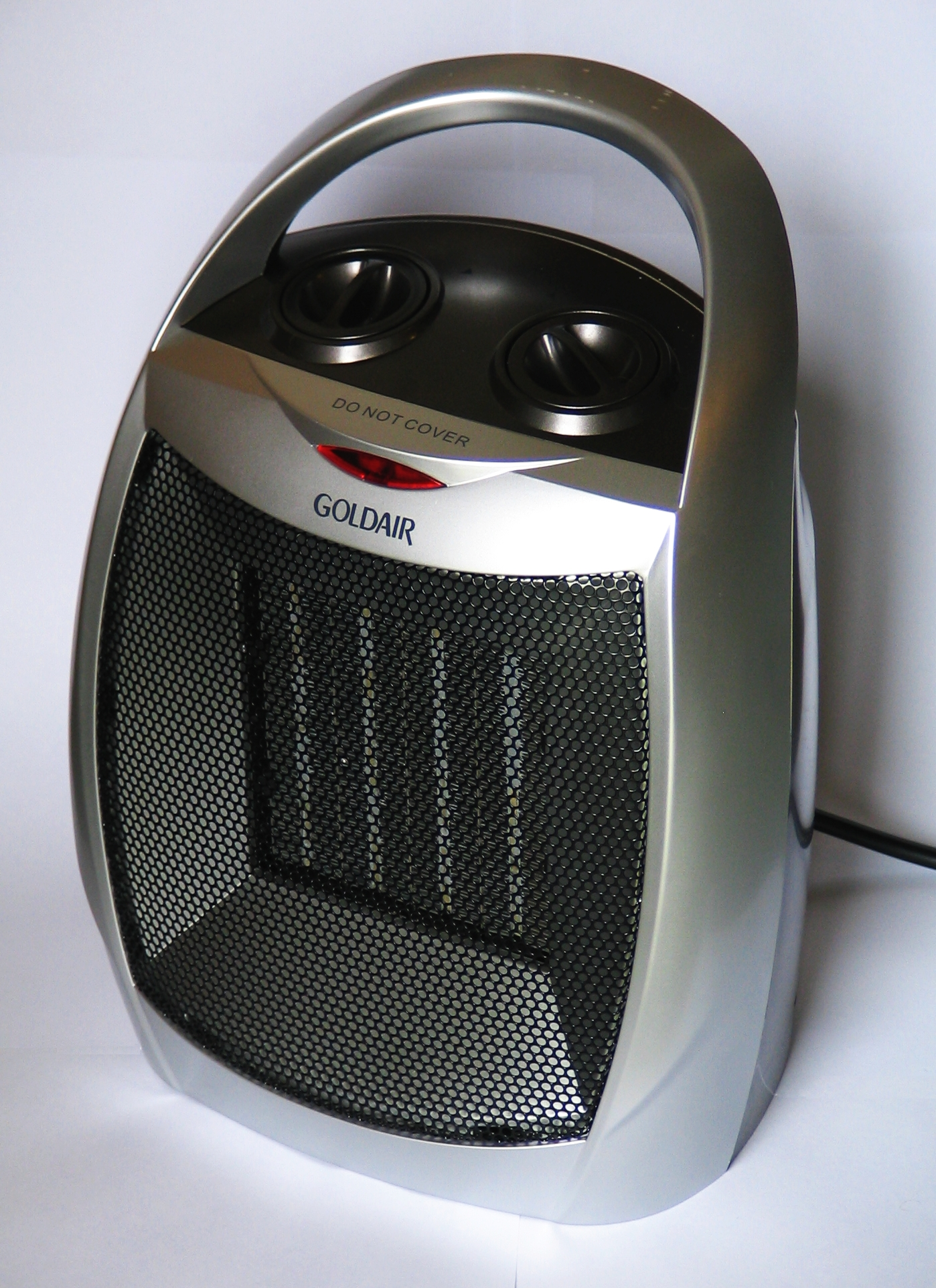
A Goldair 1800W ceramic heater

A ceramic heater as a consumer product is a space heater that generates heat using a heating element of ceramic with a positive temperature coefficient (PTC). Ceramic heaters are usually portable and typically used for heating a room or small office, and are of similar utility to metal-element fan heaters.

== Heating principle ==
PTC ceramic material is semi-conductive and when voltage is applied to it, the power decreases quickly as it reaches a certain temperature according to the particular composition of the ceramic. The ceramic elements are in contact with aluminium fins, thereby heating the fins. A fan blows air across the fins, cooling the fins as they heat the air.

== Differences from other electric heaters ==
Electric heating elements made of resistance wire also have a positive temperature coefficient of resistivity, but do not increase their resistance enough to be self-regulating; they are typically used with the wires red-hot. The ceramic, on the other hand, increases its resistance sharply at the Curie temperatures of the crystalline components, typically 120 degrees Celsius, and remains below 200 degrees Celsius, providing a significant safety advantage. Like other types of heater, ceramic heaters additionally have thermostats which switch power to the PTC array on and off in response to the temperature of the room.

== History ==
Heater vendors first offered ceramic heaters in 1986. By 1989, approximately twenty percent of portable household heaters sold in the USA were ceramic heaters.

== Heating elements ==
Ceramic fin is one type of heating element used in heaters. These units contain a solid block of ceramic material with metal fins attached. An electric current heats the block, which in turn heats the fins. The fins then heat the air. In another type of heating element, the honeycomb disk, the block of ceramic is perforated with numerous holes. The air is heated as it flows through the holes. No fins are required for honeycomb disk heating elements.

== Criticism ==
In the 1980s, some manufacturers were making advertising claims that critics such as New York Times writer Matthew L. Wald found dubious. In particular, manufacturers claimed ceramic heaters produced more heat than conventional ones, even when both were rated with the same heat output.

Consumers Union has not found significant differences between ceramic and conventional heaters. However, in its 1989 review, the testing organization did treat ceramic heaters as a separate category, as a response to manufacturer claims. The only significant difference it found was ceramic heaters were substantially more expensive. As a category, the conventional heaters it tested that year slightly outperformed ceramic heaters in the areas of evenly heating all parts of a room and at holding the room at a steady temperature. Consumers Union did find ceramic heaters' characteristic of sharply reducing heat output when airflow was blocked to be a useful safety feature. However, it found that the tip-over switches and overheat-protection sensors included in many conventional heaters also provided good safety.
