= Infrared =

Form of electromagnetic radiation

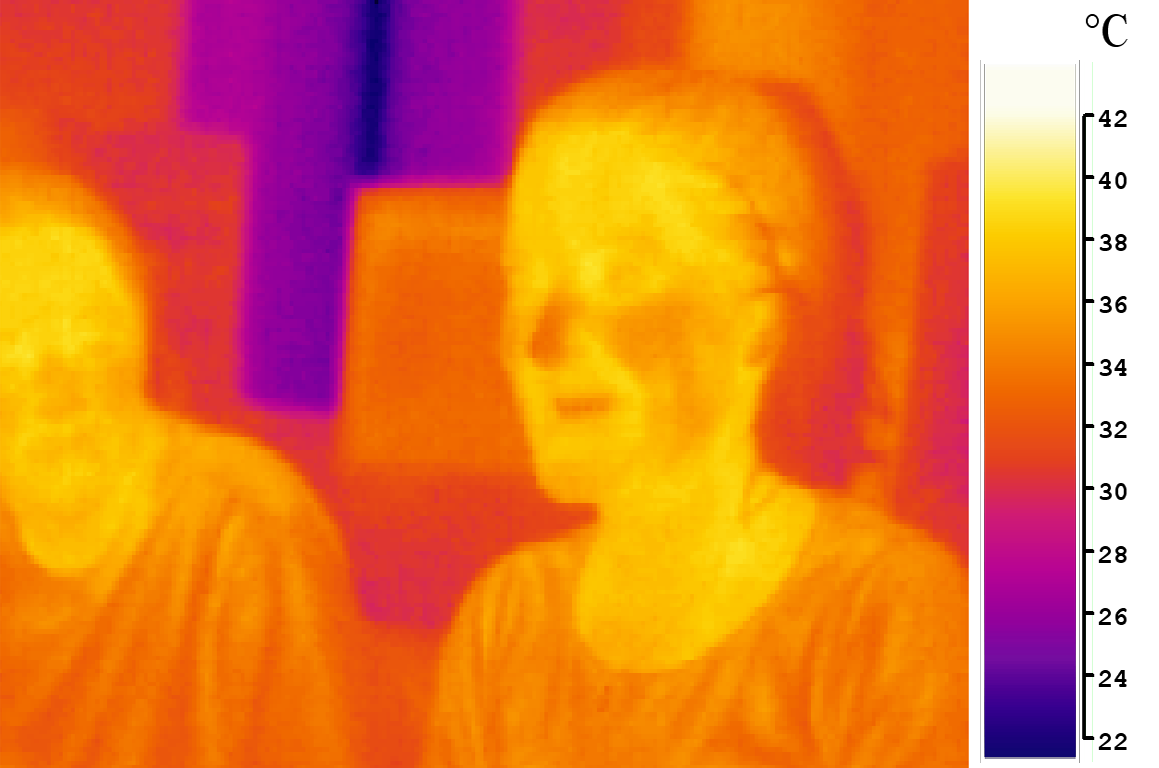
A false-color image of two people taken in long-wavelength infrared (body-temperature thermal) radiation

Infrared radiation (IR; sometimes called infrared light) is electromagnetic radiation (EMR) with wavelengths longer than that of visible light but shorter than microwaves. The infrared spectral band begins with the waves that are just longer than those of red light (the longest waves in the visible spectrum), so IR is, per definition, invisible to the human eye. IR is generally (according to ISO, CIE) understood to include wavelengths from around 780 nm (380 THz) to 30 μm (10.0 THz). IR is commonly divided between longer-wavelength thermal IR, emitted from terrestrial sources, and shorter-wavelength IR, or near IR, part of the solar spectrum. Longer IR wavelengths (30–100 μm) are sometimes included as part of the terahertz radiation band. Almost all black-body radiation from objects near room temperature is in the IR band. As a form of EMR, IR carries energy and momentum, exerts radiation pressure, and has properties corresponding to both those of a wave and of a particle, the photon.

It was long known that fires emit invisible heat; in 1681 the pioneering experimenter Edme Mariotte showed that glass, though transparent to sunlight, obstructed radiant heat. In 1800 the astronomer Sir William Herschel discovered that infrared radiation is a type of invisible radiation in the spectrum lower in energy than red light, by means of its effect on a thermometer. Slightly more than half of the energy from the Sun was eventually found, through Herschel's studies, to arrive on Earth in the form of infrared. The balance between absorbed and emitted infrared radiation has an important effect on Earth's climate.

Infrared radiation is emitted or absorbed by molecules when changing rotational-vibrational movements. It excites vibrational modes in a molecule through a change in the dipole moment, making it a useful frequency range for the study of these energy states for molecules of the proper symmetry. Infrared spectroscopy examines absorption and transmission of photons in the infrared range.

Infrared radiation is used in industrial, scientific, military, commercial, and medical applications. Night-vision devices using active near-infrared illumination allow people or animals to be observed without the observer being detected. Infrared astronomy uses sensor-equipped telescopes to penetrate dusty regions of space such as molecular clouds, to detect objects such as planets, and to view highly red-shifted objects from the early days of the universe. Infrared thermal-imaging cameras are used to detect heat loss in insulated systems, to observe changing blood flow in the skin, to assist firefighting, and to detect the overheating of electrical components. Military and civilian applications include target acquisition, surveillance, night vision, homing, and tracking. Humans at normal body temperature radiate chiefly at wavelengths around 10 μm. Non-military uses include thermal efficiency analysis, environmental monitoring, industrial facility inspections, detection of grow-ops, remote temperature sensing, short-range wireless communication, spectroscopy, and weather forecasting.

== Definition and relationship to the electromagnetic spectrum ==
There is no universally accepted definition of the range of infrared radiation. Typically, it is taken to extend from the nominal red edge of the visible spectrum at 780 nm to 1 mm. This range of wavelengths corresponds to a frequency range of approximately 430 THz down to 300 GHz. Beyond infrared is the microwave portion of the electromagnetic spectrum. Increasingly, terahertz radiation is counted as part of the microwave band, not infrared, moving the band edge of infrared to 0.1 mm (3 THz).

Position in the electromagnetic spectrum
Name	Wavelength	Frequency (Hz)	Photon energy (eV)
Gamma ray	less than 10 pm	more than 30 EHz	more than 124 keV
X-ray	10 pm – 10 nm	30 EHz – 30 PHz	124 keV – 124 eV
Ultraviolet	10 nm – 400 nm	30 PHz – 750 THz	124 eV – 3.3 eV
Visible	400 nm – 700 nm	750 THz – 430 THz	3.3 eV – 1.7 eV
Infrared	700 nm – 30 um	430 THz – 10 Thz	1.7 eV – 41.36 meV
Terahertz radiation	30 um – 1 mm	10 THz – 300 Ghz	41.36 meV – 1.24 meV
Microwave	1 mm – 1 meter	300 GHz – 300 MHz	1.24 meV – 1.24 μeV
Radio	1 meter and more	300 MHz and below	1.24 μeV and below

== Nature ==
Sunlight, at an effective temperature of 5,780 K (5,510 °C, 9,940 °F), is composed of near-thermal-spectrum radiation that is slightly more than half infrared. At zenith, sunlight provides an irradiance of just over 1 kW per square meter at sea level. Of this energy, 527 W is infrared radiation, 445 W is visible light, and 32 W is ultraviolet radiation. Nearly all the infrared radiation in sunlight is near infrared, shorter than 4 μm.

On the surface of Earth, at far lower temperatures than the surface of the Sun, some thermal radiation consists of infrared in the mid-infrared region, much longer than in sunlight. Black-body, or thermal, radiation is continuous: it radiates at all wavelengths. Of these natural thermal radiation processes, only lightning and natural fires are hot enough to produce much visible energy, and fires produce far more infrared than visible-light energy.

== Regions ==
In general, objects emit infrared radiation across a spectrum of wavelengths, but sometimes only a limited region of the spectrum is of interest because sensors usually collect radiation only within a specific bandwidth. Thermal infrared radiation also has a maximum emission wavelength, which is inversely proportional to the absolute temperature of object, in accordance with Wien's displacement law. The infrared band is often subdivided into smaller sections, although how the IR spectrum is thereby divided varies between different areas in which IR is employed.

=== Visible limit ===
Infrared radiation is generally considered to begin with wavelengths longer than visible by the human eye. There is no hard wavelength limit to what is visible, as the eye's sensitivity decreases rapidly but smoothly, for wavelengths exceeding about 700 nm. Therefore wavelengths just longer than that can be seen if they are sufficiently bright, though they may still be classified as infrared according to usual definitions. Light from a near-IR laser may thus appear dim red and can present a hazard since it may actually carry a large amount of energy. Even IR at wavelengths up to 1,050 nm from pulsed lasers can be seen by humans under certain conditions.

=== Commonly used subdivision scheme ===
A commonly used subdivision scheme is:

Division name	Abbreviation	Wavelength	Frequency	Photon energy	Temperature (Note: Temperatures of black bodies for which spectral peaks fall at the given wavelengths, according to the wavelength form of Wien's displacement law.)	Characteristics
Near infrared	NIR, IR-A DIN	0.75–1.4 μm	214–400 THz	886–1,653 meV	3,864–2,070 K (3,591–1,797 °C)	Goes up to the wavelength of the first water absorption band, and commonly used in fiber optic telecommunication because of low attenuation losses in the SiO_{2} glass (silica) medium. Image intensifiers are sensitive to this area of the spectrum; examples include night vision devices such as night vision goggles. Near-infrared spectroscopy is another common application.
Short-wavelength infrared	SWIR, IR-B DIN	1.4–3 μm	100–214 THz	413–886 meV	2,070–966 K (1,797–693 °C)	Water absorption increases significantly at 1,450 nm. The 1,530 to 1,560 nm range is the dominant spectral region for long-distance telecommunications (see transmission windows).
Mid-wavelength infrared	MWIR, IR-C DIN; MidIR. Also called intermediate infrared (IIR)	3–8 μm	37–100 THz	155–413 meV	966–362 K (693–89 °C)	In guided missile technology the 3–5 μm portion of this band is the atmospheric window in which the seekers of passive IR 'heat seeking' missiles are designed to work, homing on to the infrared signature of the target aircraft, typically the jet engine exhaust plume. This region is also known as thermal infrared.
Long-wavelength infrared	LWIR, IR-C DIN	8–15 μm	20–37 THz	83–155 meV	362–193 K (89 – −80 °C)	The "thermal imaging" region, in which sensors can obtain a completely passive image of objects only slightly higher in temperature than room temperature – for example, the human body – based on thermal emissions only and requiring no illumination such as the sun or moon or an infrared illuminator. This region is also called the "thermal infrared".
Far infrared	FIR	15–30 μm	10-20 THz	41-83 meV	193–96 K (−80.1 – −177.2 °C)	(see also far-infrared laser and far infrared)

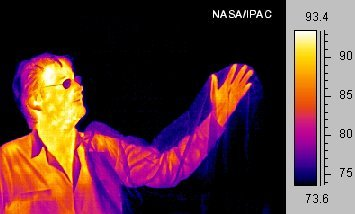
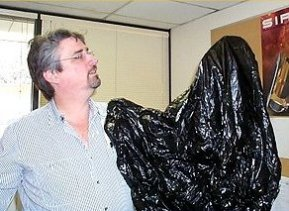
A comparison of a thermal image (top) and an ordinary photograph (bottom). The plastic bag is mostly transparent to long-wavelength infrared, but the man's glasses are opaque.

The band comprising NIR and SWIR together is sometimes called reflected infrared, whereas the band comprising MWIR and LWIR is sometimes referred to as thermal infrared.

=== CIE division scheme ===
The International Commission on Illumination (CIE) recommended the division of infrared radiation into the following three bands:

Abbreviation	Wavelength	Frequency
IR-A	780–1400 nm	215–384 THz
IR-B	1400–3000 nm	100–215 THz
IR-C	3–1000 μm	0.3–100 THz

=== ISO 20473 scheme ===
ISO 20473 specifies the following scheme:

Designation	Abbreviation	Wavelength
Near infrared	NIR	0.78–3 μm
Mid infrared	MIR	3–50 μm
Far infrared	FIR	50–1,000 μm

=== Astronomy division scheme ===
Astronomers typically divide the infrared spectrum as follows:

Designation	Abbreviation	Wavelength
Near infrared	NIR	0.7–2.5 μm
Mid infrared	MIR	3–25 μm
Far infrared	FIR	above 25 μm

These divisions are not precise and can vary depending on the publication. The three regions are used for observation of different temperature ranges, and hence different environments in space.

The most common photometric system used in astronomy allocates capital letters to different spectral regions according to filters used; I, J, H, and K cover the near-infrared wavelengths; L, M, N, and Q refer to the mid-infrared region. These letters are commonly understood in reference to atmospheric windows and appear, for instance, in the titles of many papers.

=== Sensor response division scheme ===
Plot of atmospheric transmittance in part of the infrared region

A third scheme divides up the band based on the response of various detectors:

- Near infrared: from 0.7 to 1.0 μm (from the approximate end of the response of the human eye to that of silicon).
- Short-wave infrared: 1.0 to 3 μm (from the cut-off of silicon to that of the MWIR atmospheric window). InGaAs covers to about 1.8 μm; the less sensitive lead salts cover this region. Cryogenically cooled MCT detectors can cover the region of 1.0–2.5 μm.
- Mid-wave infrared: 3 to 5 μm (defined by the atmospheric window and covered by indium antimonide, InSb and mercury cadmium telluride, HgCdTe, and partially by lead selenide, PbSe).
- Long-wave infrared: 8 to 12, or 7 to 14 μm (this is the atmospheric window covered by HgCdTe and microbolometers).
- Very-long wave infrared (VLWIR) (12 to about 30 μm, covered by doped silicon).

Near infrared is the region closest in wavelength to the radiation detectable by the human eye. Mid and far infrared are progressively further from the visible spectrum. Other definitions follow different physical mechanisms (emission peaks, vs. bands, water absorption) and the newest follow technical reasons (the common silicon detectors are sensitive to about 1,050 nm, while InGaAs's sensitivity starts around 950 nm and ends between 1,700 and 2,600 nm, depending on the specific configuration). No international standards for these specifications are currently available.

The onset of infrared is defined (according to different standards) at various values typically between 700 nm and 800 nm, but the boundary between visible and infrared light is not precisely defined. The human eye is markedly less sensitive to light above 700 nm wavelength, so longer wavelengths make insignificant contributions to scenes illuminated by common light sources. Particularly intense near-IR light (e.g., from lasers, LEDs or bright daylight with the visible light filtered out) can be detected up to approximately 780 nm, and will be perceived as red light. Intense light sources providing wavelengths as long as 1,050 nm can be seen as a dull red glow, causing some difficulty in near-IR illumination of scenes in the dark (usually this practical problem is solved by indirect illumination). Leaves are particularly bright in the near IR, and if all visible light leaks from around an IR-filter are blocked, and the eye is given a moment to adjust to the extremely dim image coming through a visually opaque IR-passing photographic filter, it is possible to see the Wood effect, which consists of IR-glowing foliage.

=== Telecommunication bands ===
In optical communications, the part of the infrared spectrum that is used is divided into seven bands based on availability of light sources, transmitting/absorbing materials (fibers), and detectors:

Band	Descriptor	Wavelength range
O band	Original	1,260–1,360 nm
E band	Extended	1,360–1,460 nm
S band	Short wavelength	1,460–1,530 nm
C band	Conventional	1,530–1,565 nm
L band	Long wavelength	1,565–1,625 nm
U band	Ultralong wavelength	1,625–1,675 nm

The C-band is the dominant band for long-distance telecommunications networks. The S and L bands are based on less well established technology, and are not as widely deployed.

== Heat ==
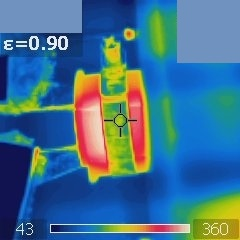
Materials with higher emissivity appear closer to their true temperature than materials that reflect more of their different-temperature surroundings. In this thermal image, the more reflective ceramic cylinder, reflecting the cooler surroundings, appears to be colder than its cubic container (made of more emissive silicon carbide), while in fact, they have the same temperature.

Infrared radiation is popularly known as "heat radiation", but light and electromagnetic waves of any frequency will heat surfaces that absorb them. Infrared light from the Sun accounts for 49% of the heating of Earth, with the rest being caused by visible light that is absorbed then re-radiated at longer wavelengths. Visible light or ultraviolet-emitting lasers can char paper and incandescently hot objects emit visible radiation. Objects at room temperature will emit radiation concentrated mostly in the 8 to 25 μm band, but this is not distinct from the emission of visible light by incandescent objects and ultraviolet by even hotter objects (see black body and Wien's displacement law).

Heat is energy in transit that flows due to a temperature difference. Unlike heat transmitted by thermal conduction or thermal convection, thermal radiation can propagate through a vacuum. Thermal radiation is characterized by a particular spectrum of many wavelengths that are associated with emission from an object, due to the vibration of its molecules at a given temperature. Thermal radiation can be emitted from objects at any wavelength, and at very high temperatures such radiation is associated with spectra far above the infrared, extending into visible, ultraviolet, and even X-ray regions (e.g. the solar corona). Thus, the popular association of infrared radiation with thermal radiation is only a coincidence based on typical (comparatively low) temperatures often found near the surface of planet Earth.

The concept of emissivity is important in understanding the infrared emissions of objects. This is a property of a surface that describes how its thermal emissions deviate from the ideal of a black body. To further explain, two objects at the same physical temperature may not show the same infrared image if they have differing emissivity. For example, for any pre-set emissivity value, objects with higher emissivity will appear hotter, and those with a lower emissivity will appear cooler (assuming, as is often the case, that the surrounding environment is cooler than the objects being viewed). When an object has less than perfect emissivity, it obtains properties of reflectivity and/or transparency, and so the temperature of the surrounding environment is partially reflected by and/or transmitted through the object. If the object were in a hotter environment, then a lower emissivity object at the same temperature would likely appear to be hotter than a more emissive one. For that reason, incorrect selection of emissivity and not accounting for environmental temperatures will give inaccurate results when using infrared cameras and pyrometers.

== Applications ==
=== Night vision ===
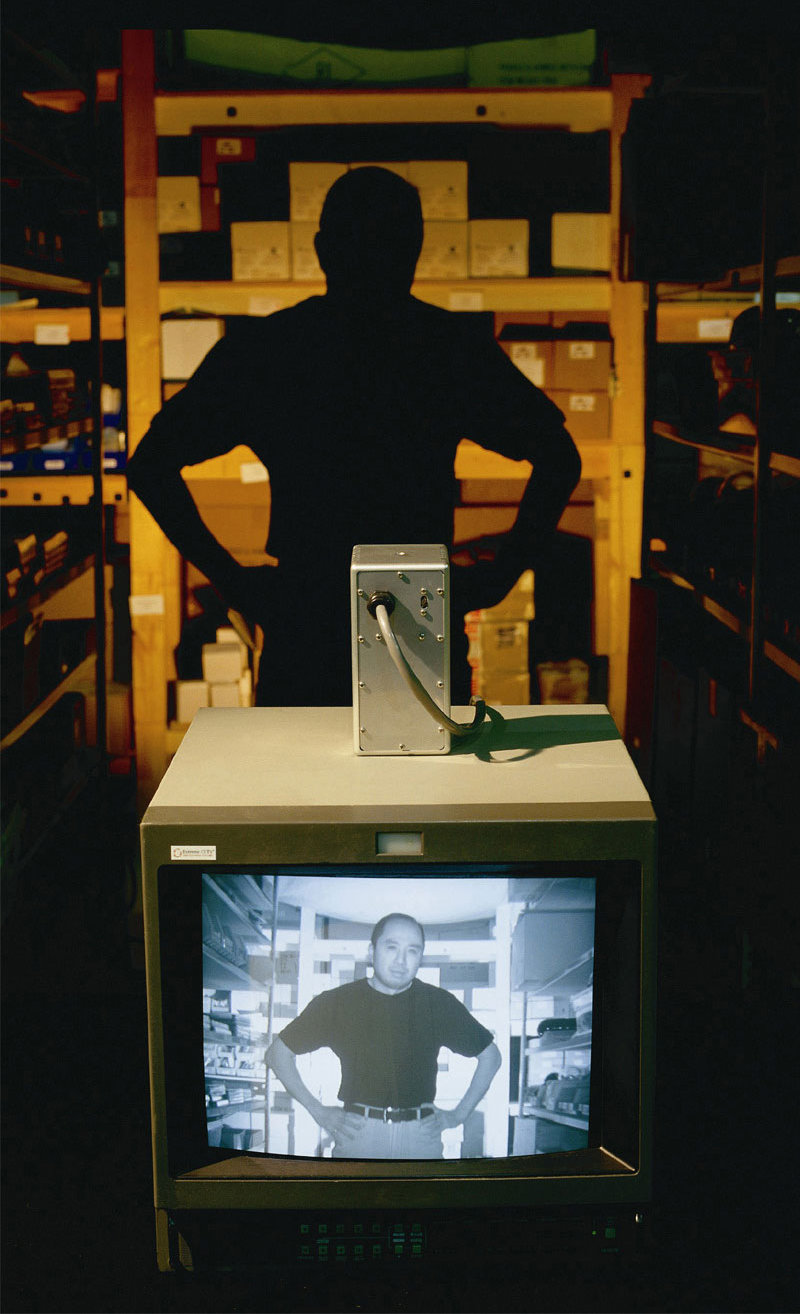
Active-infrared night vision: the camera illuminates the scene at infrared wavelengths invisible to the human eye. Despite a dark back-lit scene, active-infrared night vision delivers identifying details, as seen on the display monitor.

Infrared is used in night vision equipment when there is insufficient visible light to see. Night vision devices operate through a process involving the conversion of ambient light photons into electrons that are then amplified by a chemical and electrical process and then converted back into visible light. Infrared light sources can be used to augment the available ambient light for conversion by night vision devices, increasing in-the-dark visibility without actually using a visible light source.

The use of infrared light and night vision devices should not be confused with thermal imaging, which creates images based on differences in surface temperature by detecting infrared radiation (heat) that emanates from objects and their surrounding environment.

=== Thermography ===
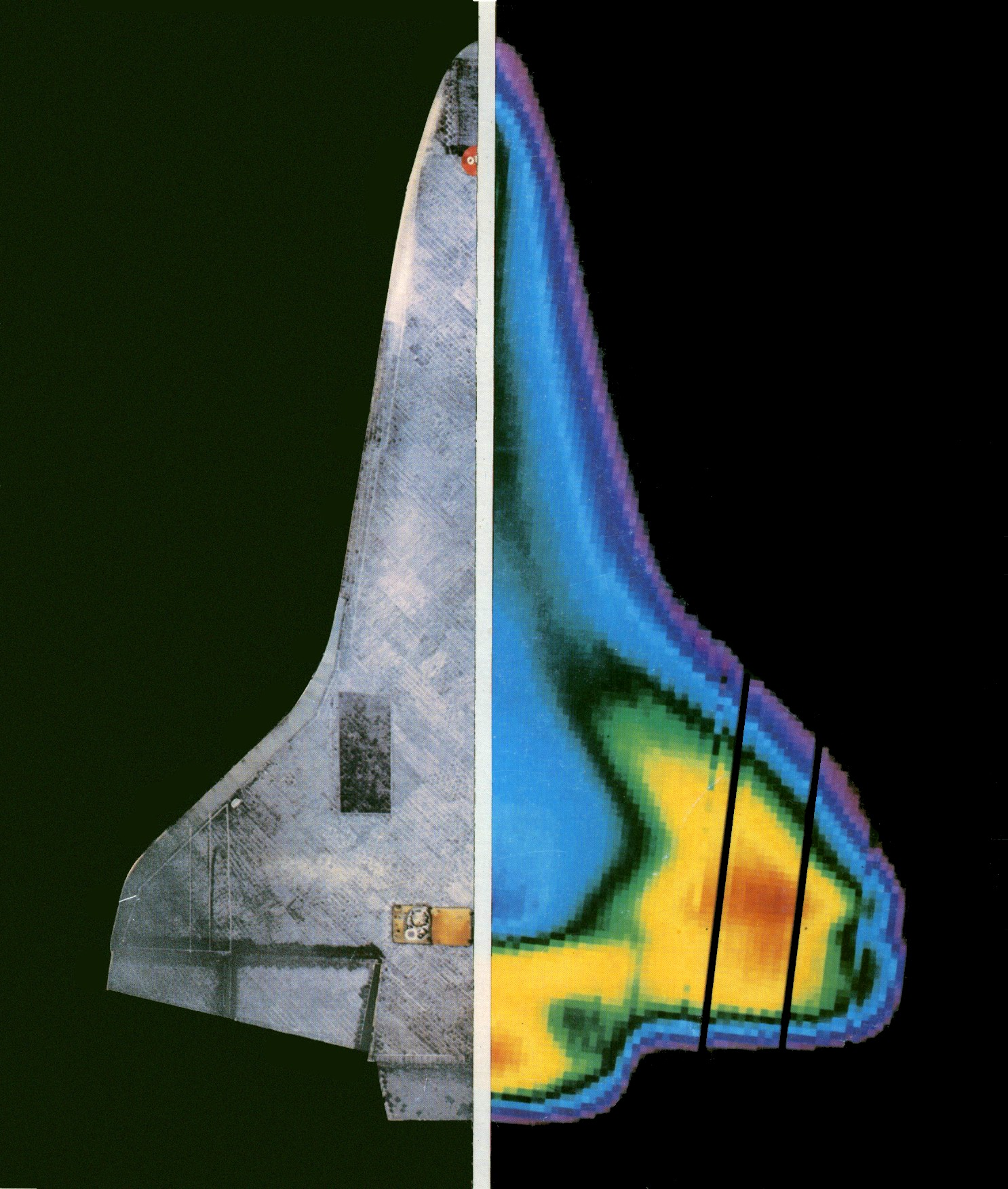
Thermography helped to determine the temperature profile of the Space Shuttle thermal protection system during re-entry.

Infrared radiation can be used to remotely determine the temperature of objects (if the emissivity is known). This is termed thermography, or in the case of very hot objects in the NIR or visible it is termed pyrometry. Thermography (thermal imaging) is mainly used in military and industrial applications but the technology is reaching the public market in the form of infrared cameras on cars due to greatly reduced production costs.

Thermographic cameras detect radiation in the infrared range of the electromagnetic spectrum (roughly 9,000–14,000 nm or 9–14 μm) and produce images of that radiation. Since infrared radiation is emitted by all objects based on their temperatures, according to the black-body radiation law, thermography makes it possible to "see" one's environment with or without visible illumination. The amount of radiation emitted by an object increases with temperature, therefore thermography allows one to see variations in temperature (hence the name).

=== Hyperspectral imaging ===
Hyperspectral thermal infrared emission measurement, an outdoor scan in winter conditions, ambient temperature −15 °C, image produced with a Specim LWIR hyperspectral imager. Relative radiance spectra from various targets in the image are shown with arrows. The infrared spectra of the different objects such as the watch clasp have clearly distinctive characteristics. The contrast level indicates the temperature of the object.

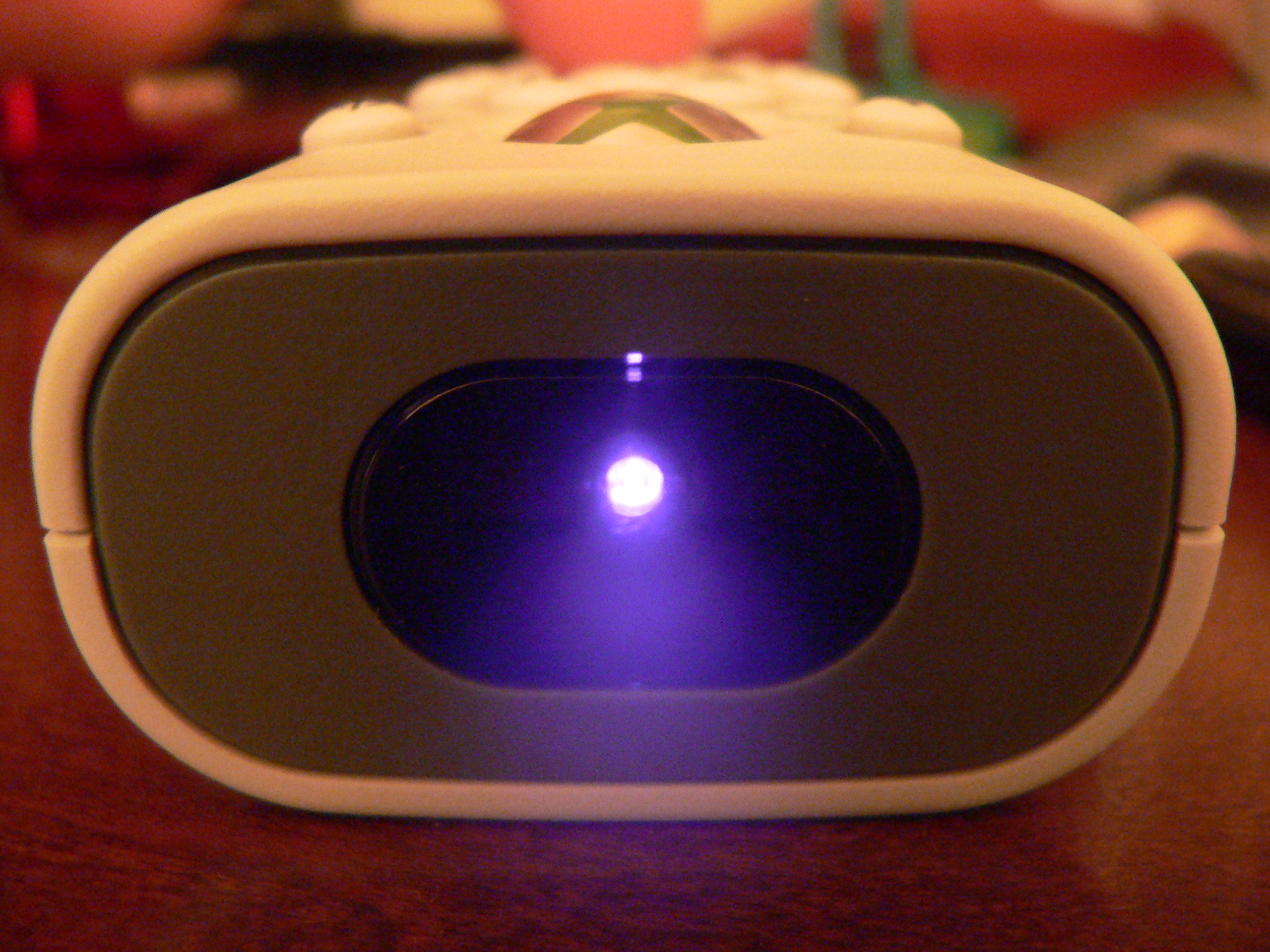
Infrared light from the LED of a remote control as recorded by a digital camera

A hyperspectral image is a "picture" containing continuous spectrum through a wide spectral range at each pixel. Hyperspectral imaging is gaining importance in the field of applied spectroscopy particularly with NIR, SWIR, MWIR, and LWIR spectral regions. Typical applications include biological, mineralogical, defence, and industrial measurements.

Thermal infrared hyperspectral imaging can be similarly performed using a thermographic camera, with the fundamental difference that each pixel contains a full LWIR spectrum. Consequently, chemical identification of the object can be performed without a need for an external light source such as the Sun or the Moon. Such cameras are typically applied for geological measurements, outdoor surveillance and UAV applications.

=== Other imaging ===
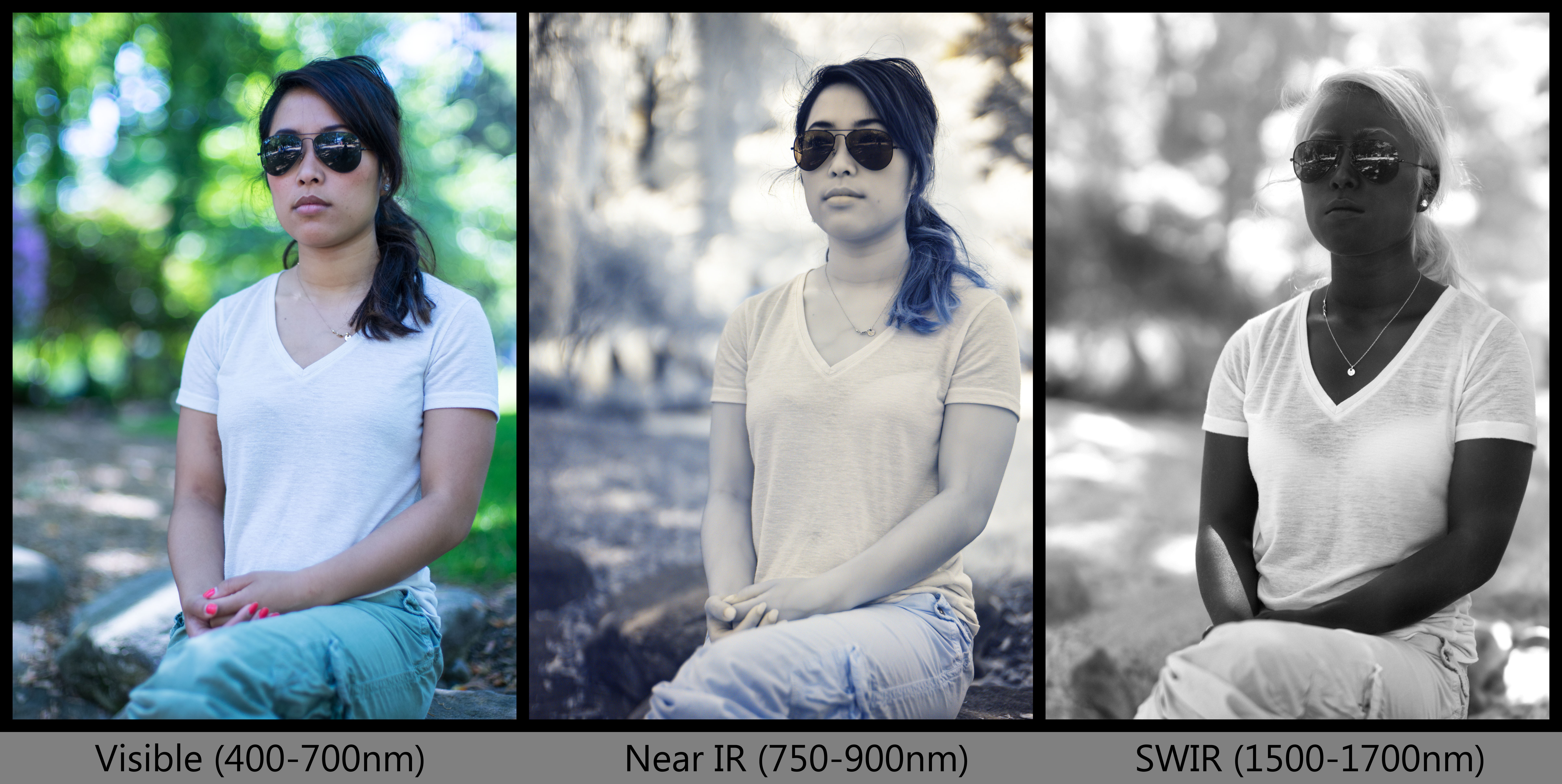
Reflected light photograph in various infrared spectra to illustrate the appearance as the wavelength of light changes

In infrared photography, infrared filters are used to capture the near-infrared spectrum. Digital cameras often use infrared blockers. Cheaper digital cameras and camera phones have less effective filters and can view intense near infrared, appearing as a bright purple–white color. This is especially pronounced when taking pictures of subjects near IR-bright areas (such as near a lamp), where the resulting infrared interference can wash out the image. There is also a technique called 'T-ray' imaging, which is imaging using far-infrared or terahertz radiation. Lack of bright sources can make terahertz photography more challenging than most other infrared imaging techniques. Recently T-ray imaging has been of considerable interest due to a number of new developments such as terahertz time-domain spectroscopy.

=== Tracking ===
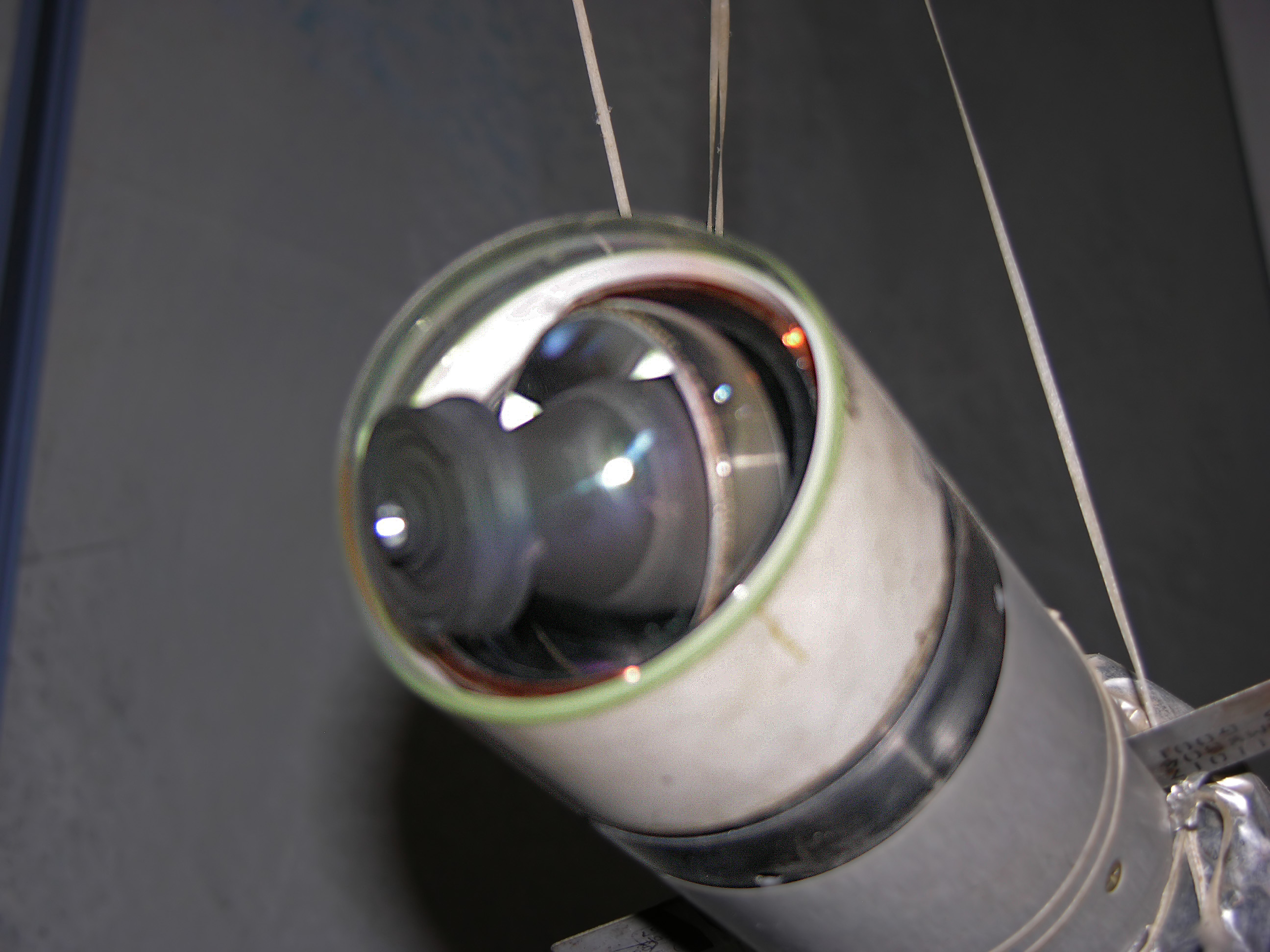
The IR seeker head on a FIM-92 MANPADS

Infrared tracking, also known as infrared homing, is a passive missile guidance system which uses the infrared emitted by a target to track it. Missiles that use infrared seeking are often referred to as "heat-seekers" since infrared is radiated strongly by hot bodies. Many objects, such as people, vehicle engines, and aircraft generate heat so contrast with cooler backgrounds.

=== Heating ===
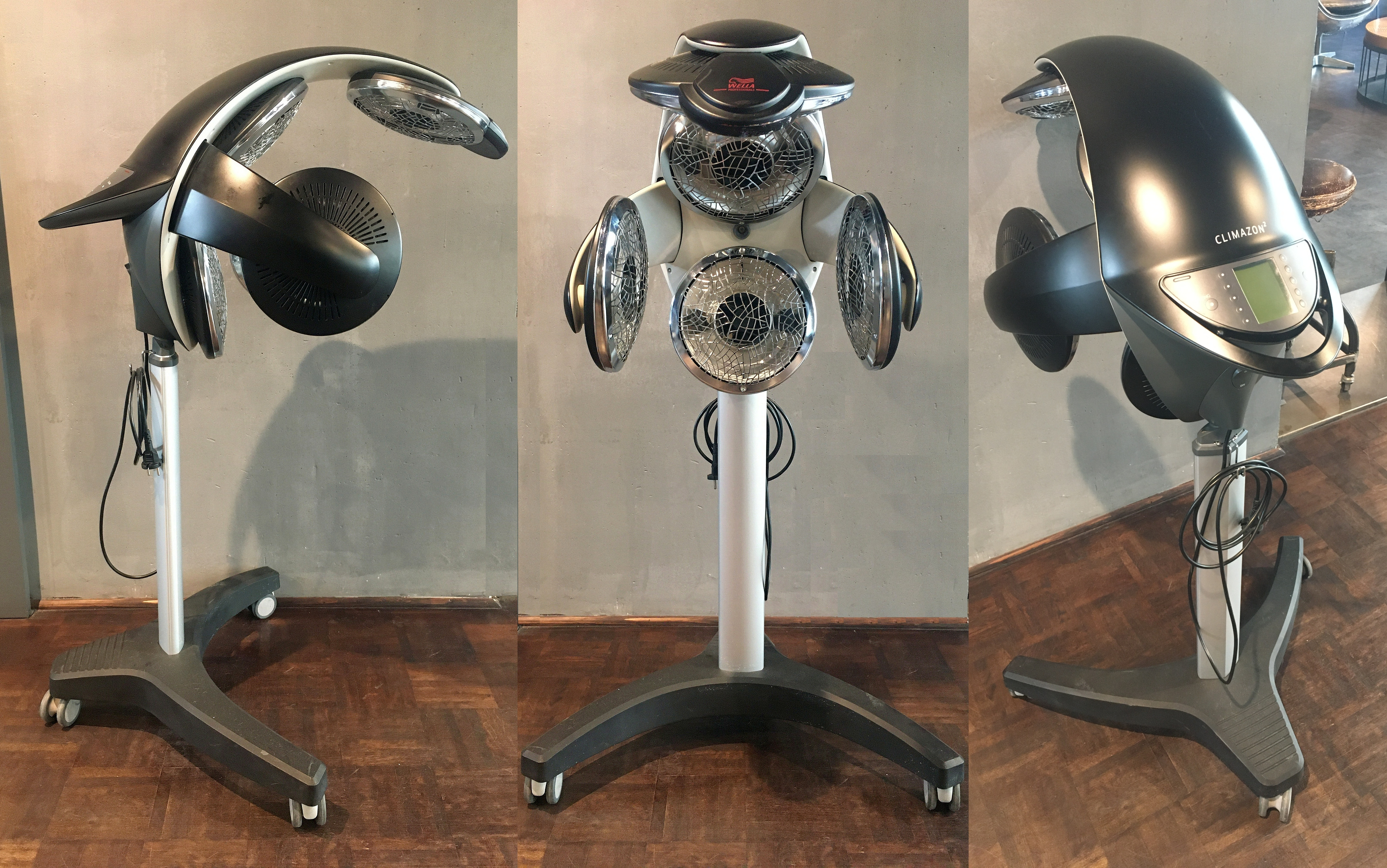
Infrared hair dryer for hair salons, c. 2010s

Infrared radiation can be used as a deliberate heating source. For example, it is used in infrared saunas to heat the occupants. It may also be used in other heating applications, such as to remove ice from the wings of aircraft (de-icing).

Infrared heating is also becoming more popular in industrial manufacturing processes, e.g. curing of coatings, forming of plastics, annealing, plastic welding, and print drying. In these applications, infrared heaters replace convection ovens and contact heating.

=== Cooling ===
A variety of technologies or proposed technologies take advantage of infrared emissions to cool buildings or other systems. The LWIR (8–15 μm) region is especially useful since some radiation at these wavelengths can escape into space through the atmosphere's infrared window. This is how passive daytime radiative cooling (PDRC) surfaces are able to achieve sub-ambient cooling temperatures under direct solar intensity, enhancing terrestrial heat flow to outer space with zero energy consumption or pollution. PDRC surfaces maximize shortwave solar reflectance to lessen heat gain while maintaining strong longwave infrared (LWIR) thermal radiation heat transfer. When imagined on a worldwide scale, this cooling method has been proposed as a way to slow and even reverse global warming, with some estimates proposing a global surface area coverage of 1-2% to balance global heat fluxes.

=== Communications ===
IR data transmission is also employed in short-range communication among computer peripherals and personal digital assistants. These devices usually conform to standards published by IrDA, the Infrared Data Association. Remote controls and IrDA devices use infrared light-emitting diodes (LEDs) to emit infrared radiation that may be concentrated by a lens into a beam that the user aims at the detector. The beam is modulated, i.e. switched on and off, according to a code which the receiver interprets. Usually very-near IR is used (below 800 nm) for practical reasons. This wavelength is efficiently detected by inexpensive silicon photodiodes, which the receiver uses to convert the detected radiation to an electric current. That electrical signal is passed through a high-pass filter which retains the rapid pulsations due to the IR transmitter but filters out slowly changing infrared radiation from ambient light. Infrared communications are useful for indoor use in areas of high population density. IR does not penetrate walls and so does not interfere with other devices in adjoining rooms. Infrared is the most common way for remote controls to command appliances. Infrared remote control protocols like RC-5, SIRC, are used to communicate with infrared.

Free-space optical communication using infrared lasers can be a relatively inexpensive way to install a communications link in an urban area operating at up to 4 gigabit/s, compared to the cost of burying fiber optic cable, except for the radiation damage. "Since the eye cannot detect IR, blinking or closing the eyes to help prevent or reduce damage may not happen."

Infrared lasers are used to provide the light for optical fiber communications systems. Wavelengths around 1,330 nm (least dispersion) or 1,550 nm (best transmission) are the best choices for standard silica fibers.

IR data transmission of audio versions of printed signs is being researched as an aid for visually impaired people through the Remote infrared audible signage project. Transmitting IR data from one device to another is sometimes referred to as beaming.

IR is sometimes used for assistive audio as an alternative to an audio induction loop.

=== Spectroscopy ===
Infrared vibrational spectroscopy (see also near-infrared spectroscopy) is a technique that can be used to identify molecules by analysis of their constituent bonds. Each chemical bond in a molecule vibrates at a frequency characteristic of that bond. A group of atoms in a molecule (e.g., CH_{2}) may have multiple modes of oscillation caused by the stretching and bending motions of the group as a whole. If an oscillation leads to a change in dipole in the molecule then it will absorb a photon that has the same frequency. The vibrational frequencies of most molecules correspond to the frequencies of infrared light. Typically, the technique is used to study organic compounds using light radiation from the mid-infrared band, 4,000–400 cm^{−1}. A spectrum of all the frequencies of absorption in a sample is recorded. This can be used to gain information about the sample composition in terms of chemical groups present and also its purity (for example, a wet sample will show a broad O-H absorption around 3200 cm^{−1}). The unit for expressing radiation in this application, cm^{−1}, is the spectroscopic wavenumber. It is the frequency divided by the speed of light in vacuum.

=== Thin-film metrology ===
In the semiconductor industry, infrared light can be used to characterize materials such as thin films and periodic trench structures. By measuring the reflectance of light from the surface of a semiconductor wafer, the index of refraction (n) and the extinction Coefficient (k) can be determined via the Forouhi–Bloomer dispersion equations. The reflectance from the infrared light can also be used to determine the critical dimension, depth, and sidewall angle of high aspect ratio trench structures.

=== Meteorology ===
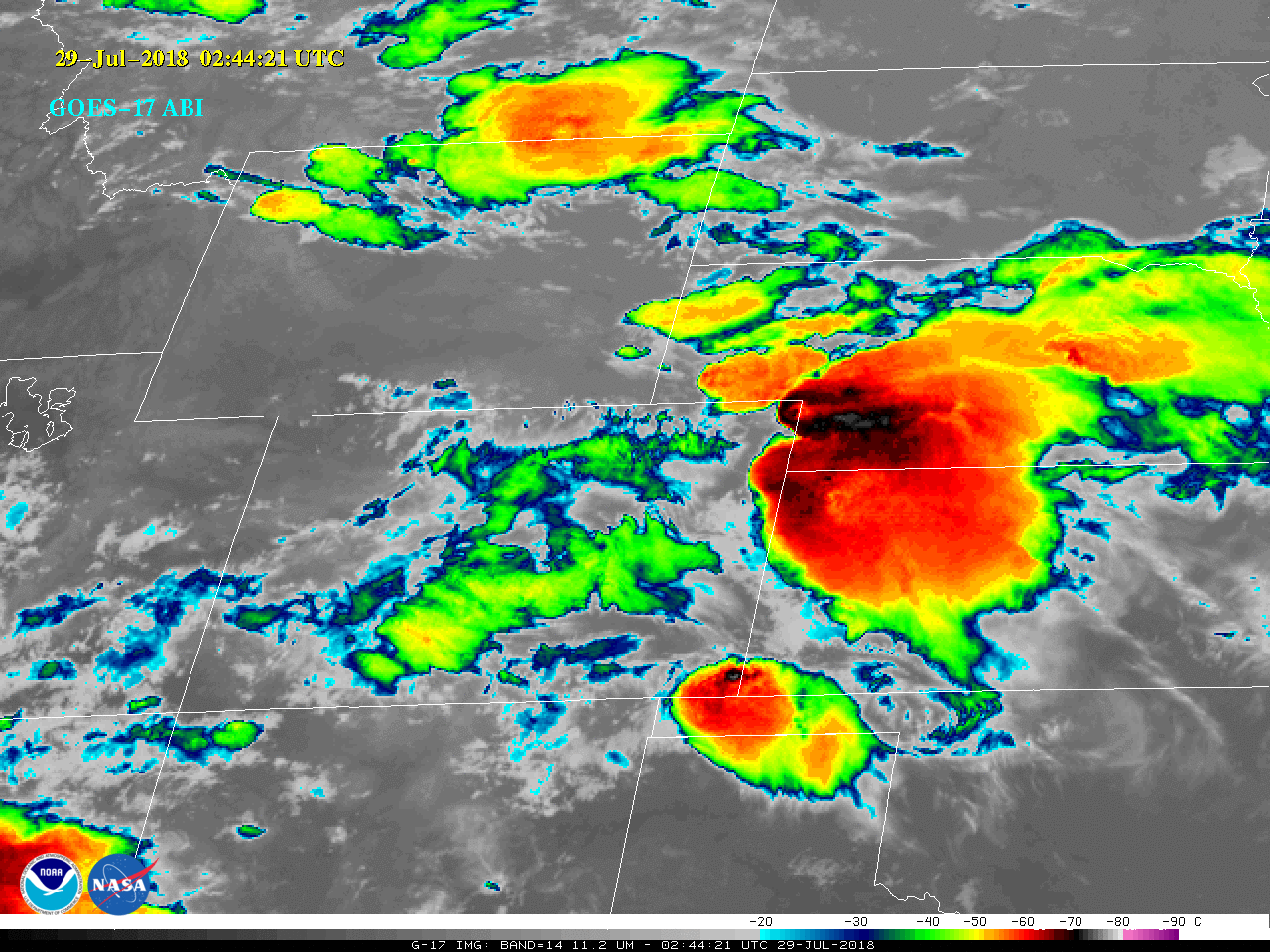
IR satellite picture of cumulonimbus clouds over the Great Plains of the United States

Weather satellites equipped with scanning radiometers produce thermal or infrared images, which can then enable a trained analyst to determine cloud heights and types, to calculate land and surface water temperatures, and to locate ocean surface features. The scanning is typically in the range 10.3–12.5 μm (IR4 and IR5 channels).

Clouds with high and cold tops, such as cyclones or cumulonimbus clouds, are often displayed as red or black, lower warmer clouds such as stratus or stratocumulus are displayed as blue or grey, with intermediate clouds shaded accordingly. Hot land surfaces are shown as dark-grey or black. One disadvantage of infrared imagery is that low clouds such as stratus or fog can have a temperature similar to the surrounding land or sea surface and do not show up. However, using the difference in brightness of the IR4 channel (10.3–11.5 μm) and the near-infrared channel (1.58–1.64 μm), low clouds can be distinguished, producing a fog satellite picture. The main advantage of infrared is that images can be produced at night, allowing a continuous sequence of weather to be studied.

These infrared pictures can depict ocean eddies or vortices and map currents such as the Gulf Stream, which are valuable to the shipping industry. Fishermen and farmers are interested in knowing land and water temperatures to protect their crops against frost or increase their catch from the sea. Even El Niño phenomena can be spotted. Using color-digitized techniques, the gray-shaded thermal images can be converted to color for easier identification of desired information.

The main water vapour channel at 6.40 to 7.08 μm can be imaged by some weather satellites and shows the amount of moisture in the atmosphere.

=== Climatology ===
The greenhouse effect with molecules of methane, water, and carbon dioxide re-radiating solar heat

In the field of climatology, atmospheric infrared radiation is monitored to detect trends in the energy exchange between the Earth and the atmosphere. These trends provide information on long-term changes in Earth's climate. It is one of the primary parameters studied in research into global warming, together with solar radiation.

A pyrgeometer is utilized in this field of research to perform continuous outdoor measurements. This is a broadband infrared radiometer with sensitivity for infrared radiation between approximately 4.5 μm and 50 μm.

=== Astronomy ===
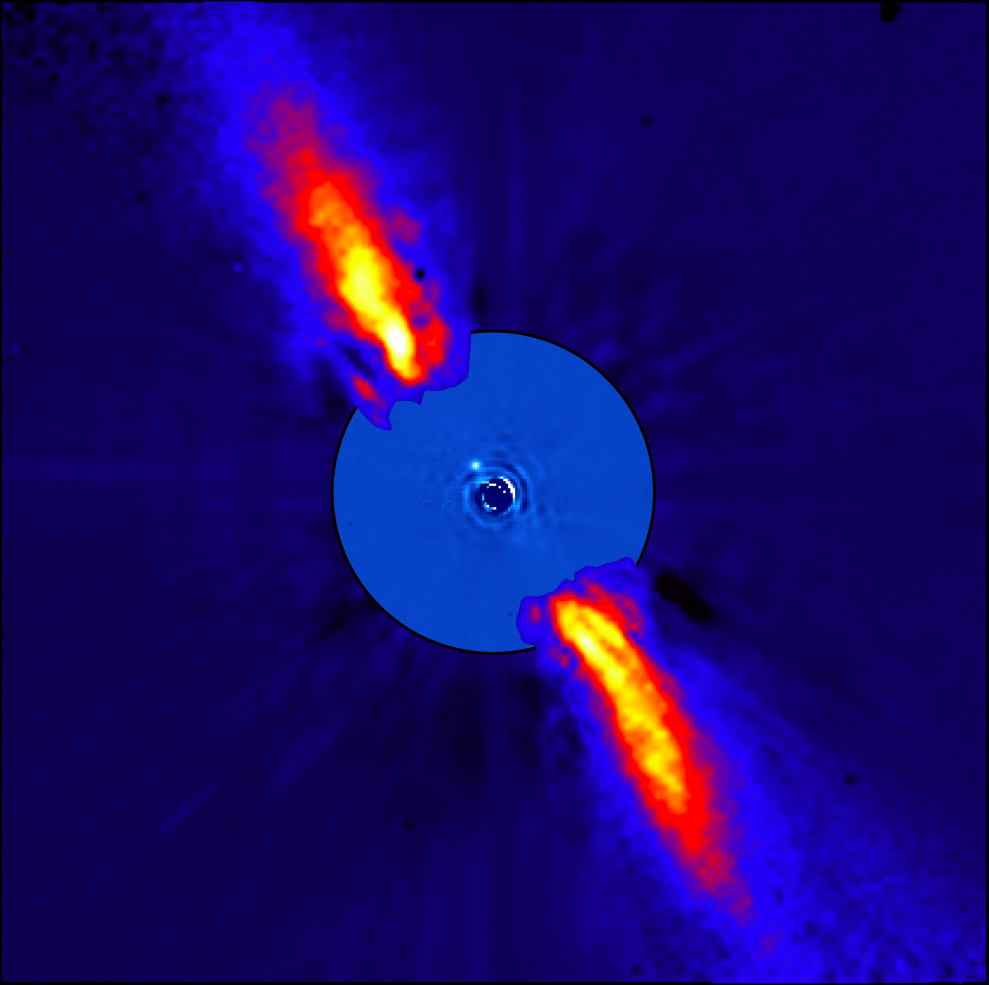
Beta Pictoris with its planet Beta Pictoris b, the light-blue dot off-center, as seen in infrared. It combines two images, the inner disc is at 3.6 μm.

Astronomers observe objects in the infrared portion of the electromagnetic spectrum using optical components, including mirrors, lenses and solid state digital detectors. For this reason it is classified as part of optical astronomy. To form an image, the components of an infrared telescope need to be carefully shielded from heat sources, and the detectors are chilled using liquid helium.

The sensitivity of Earth-based infrared telescopes is significantly limited by water vapor in the atmosphere, which absorbs a portion of the infrared radiation arriving from space outside of selected atmospheric windows. This limitation can be partially alleviated by placing the telescope observatory at a high altitude, or by carrying the telescope aloft with a balloon or an aircraft. Space telescopes do not suffer from this handicap, and so outer space is considered the ideal location for infrared astronomy.

The infrared portion of the spectrum has several useful benefits for astronomers. Cold, dark molecular clouds of gas and dust in our galaxy will glow with radiated heat as they are irradiated by imbedded stars. Infrared can also be used to detect protostars before they begin to emit visible light. Stars emit a smaller portion of their energy in the infrared spectrum, so nearby cool objects such as planets can be more readily detected. (In the visible light spectrum, the glare from the star will drown out the reflected light from a planet.)

Infrared light is also useful for observing the cores of active galaxies, which are often cloaked in gas and dust. Distant galaxies with a high redshift will have the peak portion of their spectrum shifted toward longer wavelengths, so they are more readily observed in the infrared.

=== Cleaning ===
Infrared cleaning is a technique used by some motion picture film scanners, film scanners and flatbed scanners to reduce or remove the effect of dust and scratches upon the finished scan. It works by collecting an additional infrared channel from the scan at the same position and resolution as the three visible color channels (red, green, and blue). The infrared channel, in combination with the other channels, is used to detect the location of scratches and dust. Once located, those defects can be corrected by scaling or replaced by inpainting.

=== Art conservation and analysis ===
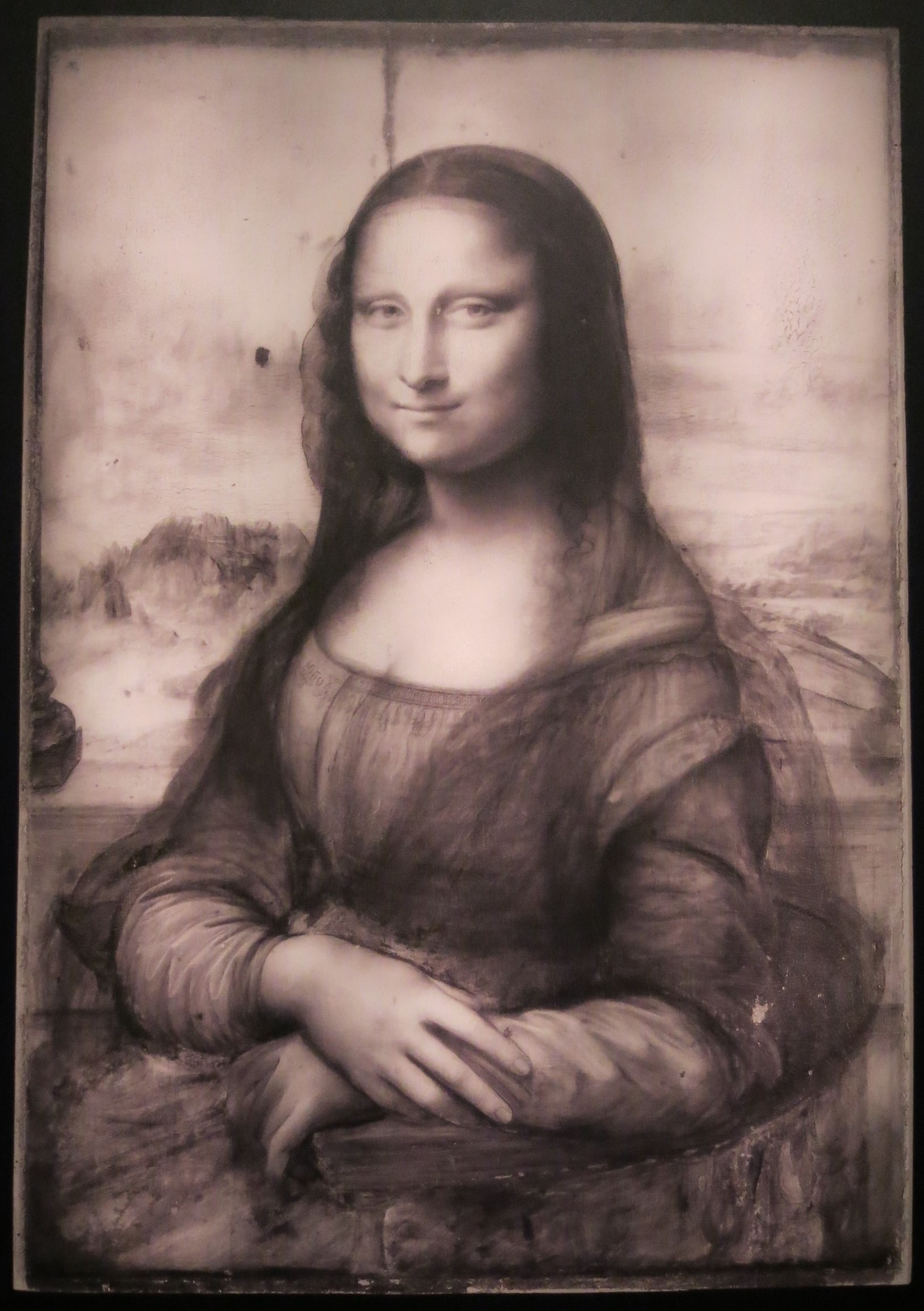
An infrared reflectogram of Mona Lisa by Leonardo da Vinci

Infrared reflectography can be applied to paintings to reveal underlying layers in a non-destructive manner, in particular the artist's underdrawing or outline drawn as a guide. Art conservators use the technique to examine how the visible layers of paint differ from the underdrawing or layers in between (such alterations are called pentimenti when made by the original artist). This is very useful information in deciding whether a painting is the prime version by the original artist or a copy, and whether it has been altered by over-enthusiastic restoration work. In general, the more pentimenti, the more likely a painting is to be the prime version. It also gives useful insights into working practices. Reflectography often reveals the artist's use of carbon black, which shows up well in reflectograms, as long as it has not also been used in the ground underlying the whole painting. Infrared reflectography can be realized by modified commercial digital cameras in the NIR spectral region or by dedicated instruments in the SWIR spectral region. The recent extension of reflectography into the MWIR spectral region has proved capable of detecting subtle differences in surface materials.

Finally, NIR reflectography can be performed with good results using smartphone cameras .

Recent progress in the design of infrared-sensitive cameras makes it possible to discover and depict not only underpaintings and pentimenti, but entire paintings that were later overpainted by the artist. Notable examples are Picasso's Woman Ironing and Blue Room, where in both cases a portrait of a man has been made visible under the painting as it is known today.

Similar uses of infrared are made by conservators and scientists on various types of objects, especially very old written documents such as the Dead Sea Scrolls, the Roman works in the Villa of the Papyri, and the Silk Road texts found in the Dunhuang Caves. Carbon black used in ink can show up extremely well.

=== Biological systems ===
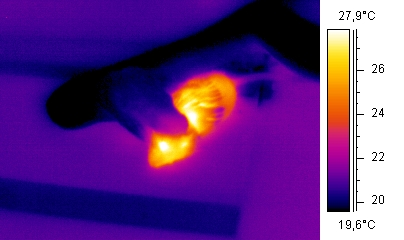
Thermographic image of a snake eating a mouse

The pit viper has a pair of infrared sensory pits on its head. There is uncertainty regarding the exact thermal sensitivity of this biological infrared detection system.

Other organisms that have thermoreceptive organs are pythons (family Pythonidae), some boas (family Boidae), the common vampire bat (Desmodus rotundus), a variety of jewel beetles (Melanophila acuminata), darkly pigmented butterflies (Pachliopta aristolochiae and Troides rhadamantus plateni), and possibly blood-sucking bugs (Triatoma infestans). By detecting the heat that their prey emits, crotaline and boid snakes identify and capture their prey using their IR-sensitive pit organs. Comparably, IR-sensitive pits on the common vampire bat (Desmodus rotundus) aid in the identification of blood-rich regions on its warm-blooded victim. The jewel beetle, Melanophila acuminata, locates forest fires via infrared pit organs, where on recently burnt trees, they deposit their eggs. Thermoreceptors on the wings and antennae of butterflies with dark pigmentation, such as Pachliopta aristolochiae and Troides rhadamantus plateni, shield them from heat damage as they sunbathe in the sun. Additionally, it's hypothesised that thermoreceptors let bloodsucking bugs (Triatoma infestans) locate their warm-blooded victims by sensing their body heat.

Some fungi, like Venturia inaequalis, require near-infrared light for ejection.

Although near-infrared vision (780–1,000 nm) has long been deemed impossible due to noise in visual pigments, sensation of near-infrared light was reported in the common carp and in three cichlid species. Fish use NIR to capture prey and for phototactic swimming orientation. NIR sensation in fish may be relevant under poor lighting conditions during twilight and in turbid surface waters.

=== Photobiomodulation ===
Near-infrared light, or photobiomodulation, is used for treatment of chemotherapy-induced oral ulceration as well as wound healing. There is some work relating to anti-herpes virus treatment. Research projects include work on central nervous system healing effects via cytochrome c oxidase upregulation and other possible mechanisms.

=== Health hazards ===
Strong infrared radiation in certain industry high-heat settings may be hazardous to the eyes, resulting in damage or blindness to the user. Since the radiation is invisible, special IR-proof goggles must be worn in such places.

== Scientific history ==
The discovery of infrared radiation is ascribed to William Herschel, the astronomer, in the early 19th century. Herschel published his results in 1800 before the Royal Society of London. Herschel used a prism to refract light from the sun and detected the infrared, beyond the red part of the spectrum, through an increase in the temperature recorded on a thermometer. He was surprised at the result and called them "Calorific Rays". The term "infrared" did not appear until the late 19th century. The Latin prefix infra- means below, as it is light below red on the spectrum. An earlier experiment in 1790 by Marc-Auguste Pictet demonstrated the reflection and focusing of radiant heat via mirrors in the absence of visible light.

Other important dates include:

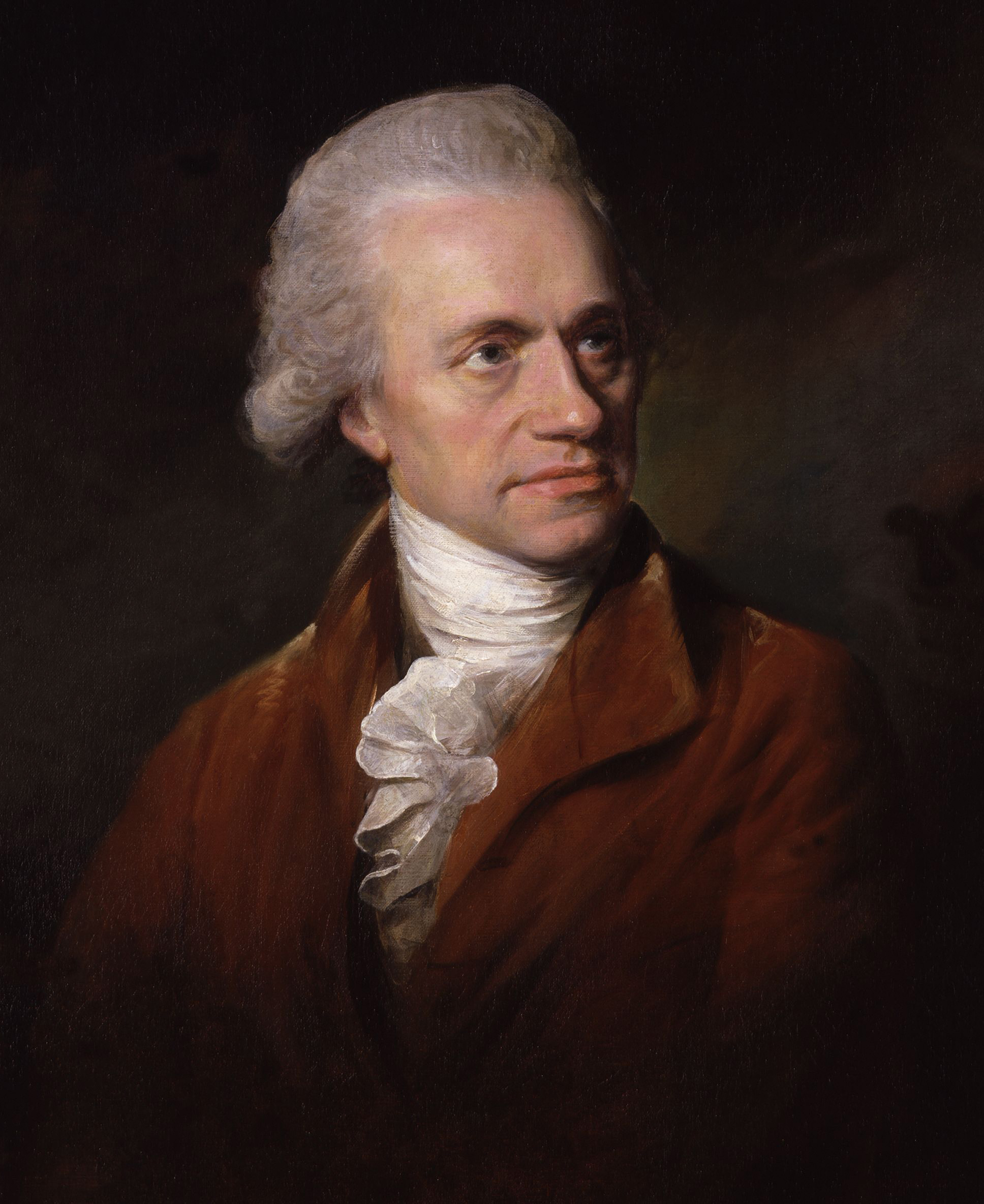
Infrared radiation was discovered in 1800 by William Herschel.

- 1830: Leopoldo Nobili made the first thermopile IR detector.
- 1840: John Herschel produces the first thermal image, called a thermogram.
- 1859: John Tyndall, investigating how gases absorb and emit infrared radiation, linked atmospheric CO_{2} to the phenomenon now known as the greenhouse effect.
- 1860: Gustav Kirchhoff formulated the blackbody theorem $E = J(T, n)$.
- 1873: Willoughby Smith discovered the photoconductivity of selenium.
- 1878: Samuel Pierpont Langley invents the first bolometer, a device which is able to measure small temperature fluctuations, and thus the power of far infrared sources.
- 1879: Stefan–Boltzmann law formulated empirically that the power radiated by a blackbody is proportional to T^{4}.
- 1880s and 1890s: Lord Rayleigh and Wilhelm Wien solved part of the blackbody equation, but both solutions diverged in parts of the electromagnetic spectrum. This problem was called the "ultraviolet catastrophe and infrared catastrophe".
- 1892: Willem Henri Julius published infrared spectra of 20 organic compounds measured with a bolometer in units of angular displacement.
- 1901: Max Planck published the blackbody equation and theorem. He solved the problem by quantizing the allowable energy transitions.
- 1905: Albert Einstein developed the theory of the photoelectric effect.
- 1905–1908: William Coblentz published infrared spectra in units of wavelength (micrometers) for several chemical compounds in Investigations of Infra-Red Spectra.
- 1917: Theodore Case developed the thallous sulfide detector, which helped produce the first infrared search and track device able to detect aircraft at a range of one mile (1.6 km).
- 1935: Lead salts – early missile guidance in World War II.
- 1938: Yeou Ta predicted that the pyroelectric effect could be used to detect infrared radiation.
- 1945: The Zielgerät 1229 "Vampir" infrared weapon system was introduced as the first portable infrared device for military applications.
- 1952: Heinrich Welker grew synthetic InSb crystals.
- 1950s and 1960s: Nomenclature and radiometric units defined by Fred Nicodemenus, G. J. Zissis and R. Clark; Robert Clark Jones defined D*.
- 1958: W. D. Lawson (Royal Radar Establishment in Malvern) discovered IR detection properties of Mercury cadmium telluride (HgCdTe).
- 1958: Falcon and Sidewinder missiles were developed using infrared technology.
- 1960s: Paul Kruse and his colleagues at Honeywell Research Center demonstrate the use of HgCdTe as an effective compound for infrared detection.
- 1962: J. Cooper demonstrated pyroelectric detection.
- 1964: W. G. Evans discovered infrared thermoreceptors in a pyrophile beetle.
- 1965: First IR handbook; first commercial imagers (Barnes, Agema (now part of FLIR Systems Inc.)); Richard Hudson's landmark text; F4 TRAM FLIR by Hughes; phenomenology pioneered by Fred Simmons and A. T. Stair; U.S. Army's night vision lab formed (now Night Vision and Electronic Sensors Directorate (NVESD)), and Rachets develops detection, recognition and identification modeling there.
- 1970: Willard Boyle and George E. Smith proposed CCD at Bell Labs for picture phone.
- 1973: Common module program started by NVESD.
- 1978: Infrared imaging astronomy came of age, observatories planned, IRTF on Mauna Kea opened; 32 × 32 and 64 × 64 arrays produced using InSb, HgCdTe and other materials.
- 2013: On 14 February, researchers developed a neural implant that gives rats the ability to sense infrared light, which for the first time provides living creatures with new abilities, instead of simply replacing or augmenting existing abilities.

== See also ==
- Black-body radiation
- Infrared non-destructive testing of materials
- Infrared solar cells
- Infrared thermometer
- People counter
- Index of infrared articles
