= Fungarium =

Scientific collection of dried fungi

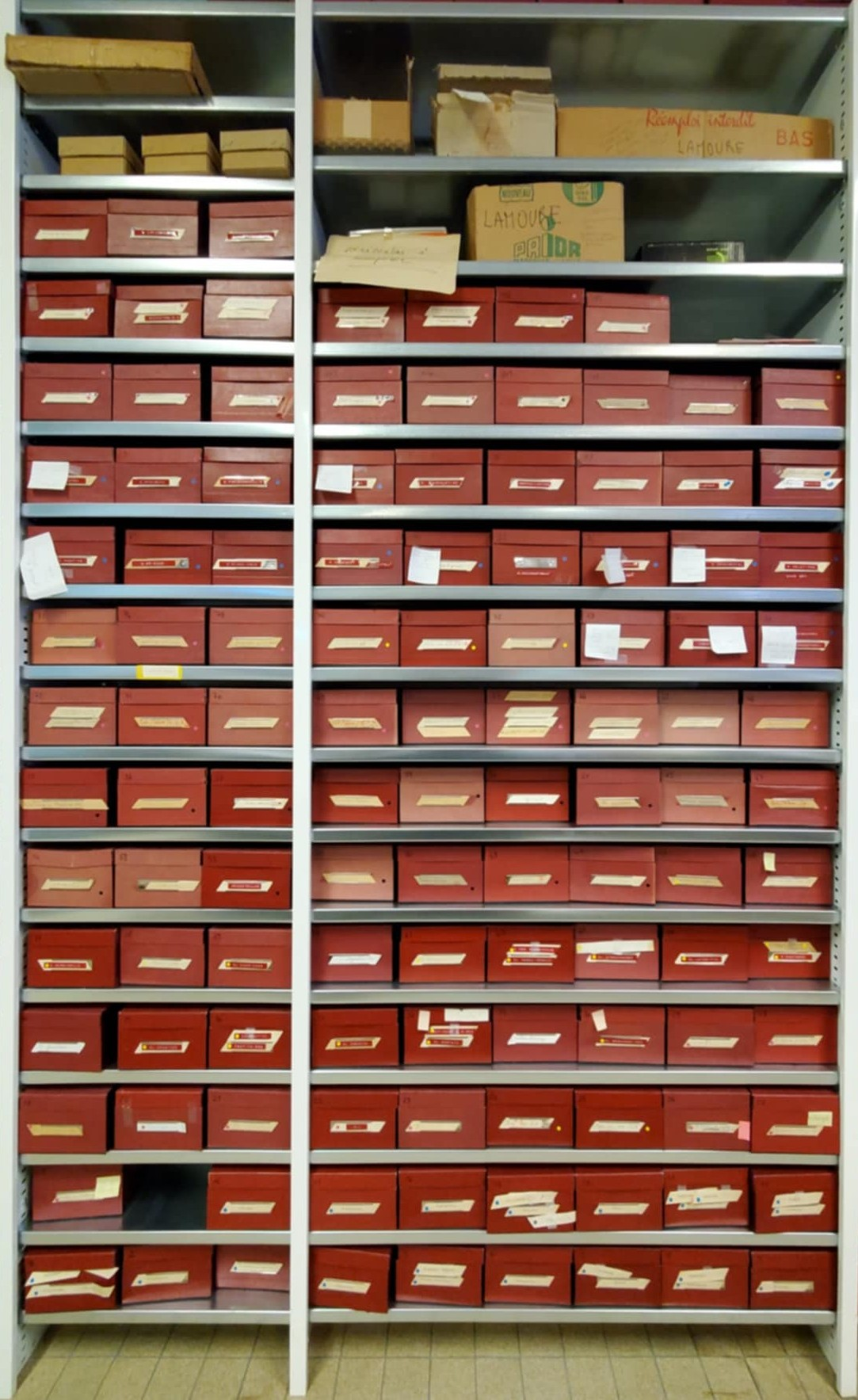
Collection cabinets containing dried fungal specimens in the Denise Lamoure mycological collection at the LY Herbarium, Claude Bernard University Lyon 1

A fungarium (plural: fungaria) is a curated collection of preserved fungal specimens and their associated data. Once known as mycological herbaria, these collections provide a permanent record for scientific research. The term was adopted in 2010 to distinguish fungal collections from herbaria (plant collections), in keeping with the modern biological recognition of fungi as a kingdom distinct from plants. Many fungaria are housed within herbaria or other natural history collections, and their holdings may include dried fruiting bodies, host material bearing microscopic fungi, permanent microscope slides, and historically important type specimens.

Fungaria developed out of older botanical and mycological collecting traditions and are now found in museums, universities, botanical institutes, and plant-pathology centres. Their specimens are prepared, labelled, stored, and organized so that they can be studied over long periods, and they are commonly accompanied by notes, images, and other documentation. While some collections emphasize large fungi like mushrooms and bracket fungi, others preserve micromycetes (microfungi) alongside their host plants. These preserved specimens differ from living cultures, but researchers often use both to study fungal classification and evolution.

These collections are used for tracking environmental changes; by comparing specimens across centuries, researchers can model species shifts and changes in biological timing caused by climate change. In modern biology, fungaria provide a library of genetic material for DNA barcoding and genomics, allowing scientists to extract and sequence DNA even from centuries-old specimens. Specimen data are increasingly digitized and shared through online portals using data standards such as Darwin Core. As of 2025, an estimated 15 to 20 million preserved fungal specimens exist worldwide, distributed across approximately 3,900 herbaria and fungaria.

== Terminology and definition ==
The term fungarium was introduced by Brian Spooner and Paul Cannon and presented by David Hawksworth in 2010 as a logical analogue to herbarium for collections of preserved fungi. Historically, mycology was treated as a sub-discipline of botany, so fungal specimens were commonly stored within herbaria. The proposal of fungarium formed part of a broader assertion of mycological independence; a related development is the use of "funga" for the fungi of a particular area, in parallel with "flora" for plants and "fauna" for animals. Hawksworth recommended fungarium for facilities whose taxonomic value centres on representative members of the Fungi, although many institutions have continued to use "herbarium" for historical reasons or for combined botanical-mycological collections.

The term gained wider professional use when the Royal Botanic Gardens, Kew adopted it for its mycological collection. While some institutions use the term to explicitly distinguish mycological holdings from plant collections, others maintain the name "herbarium" for historical continuity. Similarly, the term "lichenarium" is occasionally used by institutions that maintain separate collections of lichen specimens.

In scientific usage, a fungarium is centred on preserved fungal material, usually dried tissue such as whole reproductive structures or representative parts, though it may also include permanent microscope slides and, more rarely, specimens preserved in liquid. Fungaria are distinct from culture collections, which maintain living fungal isolates rather than dried reference specimens. In practice, the two are complementary, and a living culture is often linked to a dried voucher or other reference specimen preserved in a herbarium. The term refers not only to the physical collection but also to the curated metadata associated with each specimen, including information such as taxonomy, substrate, sampling location, and collection date. Because of long-standing practice in mycological nomenclature, fungaria may also include fungus-like organisms that are not classified as fungi under modern systems, such as oomycetes and slime moulds.

== History ==
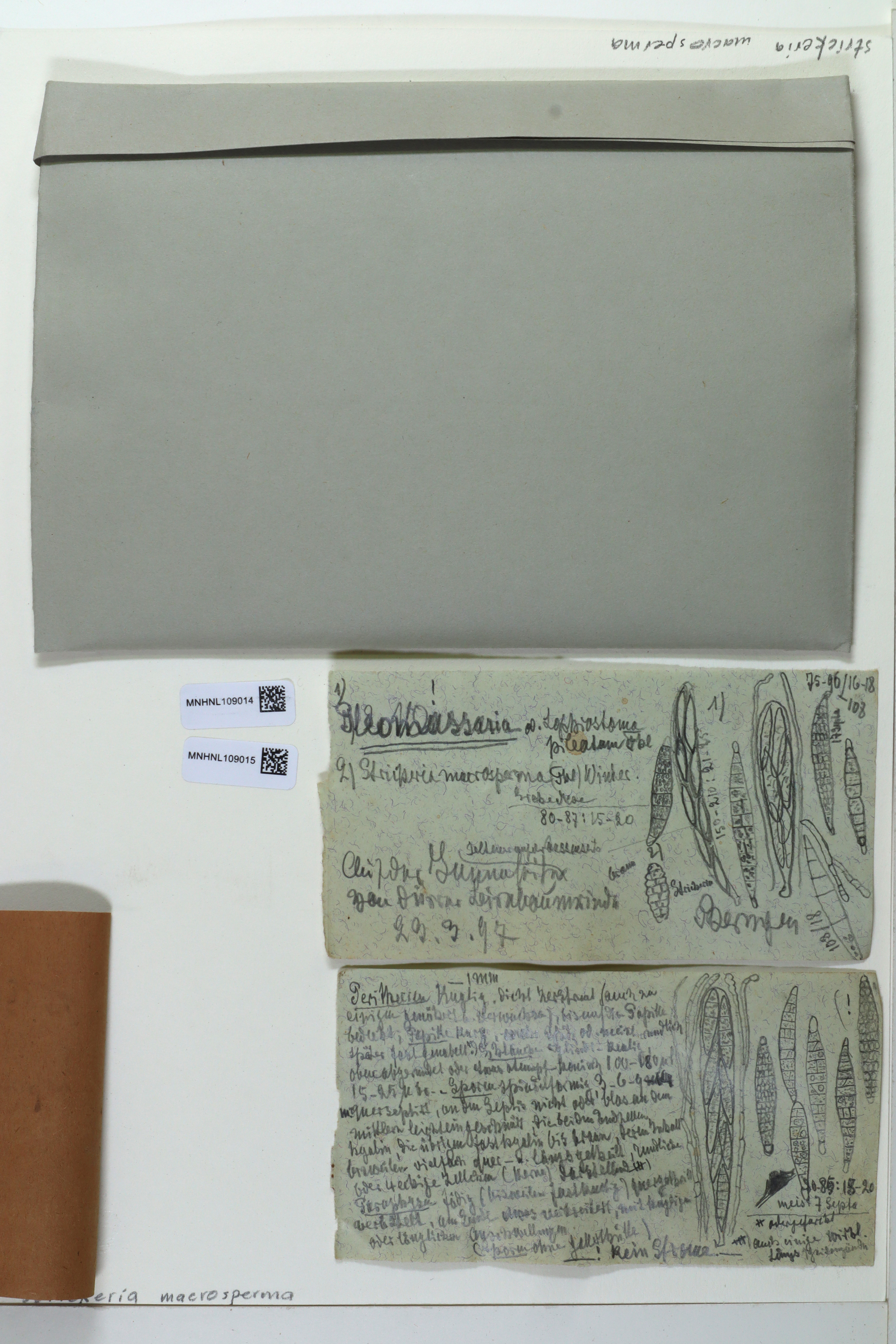
Historical herbarium specimen of a fungus collected by Jean Feltgen, showing dried material and accompanying handwritten notes and illustrations

The history of fungaria is closely tied to the early development of botanical herbaria, the oldest of which date to the mid-1500s. Fungal fruiting bodies have been collected and deposited for several centuries, with millions of specimens accumulated chiefly to support fungal taxonomy. Early collections were often personal assemblages or teaching aids used to distinguish edible mushrooms from poisonous ones. Over time, fungal herbaria shifted from keeping one or a few representative specimens per taxon toward documenting developmental stages and geographic variation within species more broadly. In some regions, fungaria developed in close association with government plant-pathology programmes; in South Africa, for example, organised collecting expanded after the creation of a mycology post in 1905 and a separate Division of Plant Pathology and Mycology in 1910, whose early staff built the nucleus of the Pretoria herbarium.

At the Royal Botanic Gardens, Kew, the mycological collection was established in the late 19th century after the donation of more than 10,000 fungal specimens by the mycologist Reverend Miles Joseph Berkeley. It was later enlarged through donations and collecting by staff and collaborators. More generally, fungaria were often built through a combination of personal collections, academic donations, and purchased exsiccatae series, drawing on wider networks of scientific exchange among mycologists. Amateur mycologists, natural-history societies, and other non-academic collectors have also long played an important part in building fungarium collections and documenting fungal diversity. The collection of Jerzy Wojciech Szulczewski, who gathered specimens in Wielkopolska, Poland, from 1909 to 1966, serves as a representative historical archive. Now housed at Adam Mickiewicz University, it is one of Poland's most extensive records of microfungi and plant pathogens. The archive's transition from decorative 19th-century calligraphy to functional post-war volumes illustrates how biological collections can persist through periods of socio-political disruption. Historical fungaria can also be damaged, dispersed, or lost, and the destruction of collections through war and other disruptions remains a long-term concern for their documentary value.

By the early 20th century, curators were already discussing how mycological specimens should be arranged to balance preservation, space efficiency, and ease of access for study, using packets, folders, boxes, and index card systems. Older fungaria could remain effectively inaccessible until specimens were rehoused and rearranged; at the Rijksherbarium, much of the cryptogamic material was once stored in sacks and packets before mounting and boxing made it more accessible for study. By the middle of 1982, the Soviet Union alone maintained major mycological herbaria across 25 research institutions or museums and 11 universities, academies, and institutes, together preserving more than one million fungal specimens, including over 5,000 type specimens. The transition from morphology-based systematics to phylogenetics in the 1980s and 1990s further changed the role of historical collections, as scientists began extracting DNA from specimens collected more than a century earlier. Historical plant herbaria as well as dedicated mycological collections have also yielded valuable fungal and oomycete records when older specimens were re-examined for disease symptoms that were not the original focus of collection.

== Contents and curation ==
Because curation resources are finite, accession policies commonly prioritize poorly represented taxa and geographic areas, legally collected material, authoritative identifications, and specimens that can be housed and made available for study.

=== Specimen types ===
The principal component of most fungaria is the dried fungal sporocarp, the visible reproductive structure produced by the vegetative mycelia living within the substrate. Macromycetes, which produce conspicuous structures such as mushrooms, puffballs, and bracket fungi, are heavily represented in many collections. Micromycetes, including rusts, smuts, and powdery mildews, are often collected together with their host plants. When collecting host-associated fungi, curators may also preserve a voucher of the substrate or host plant so that host identity can be checked later. In fungaria of micromycetes, specimens may include not only dried spore-bearing structures but also part of the substrate, or more rarely dried cultures on nutrient agar prepared from Petri dishes. For biotrophic pathogens, the combined substrate-fungal specimen can also provide material for studying cophylogeny and coevolution. Taxonomic representation in fungaria is uneven: groups with macroscopic fruiting bodies are generally overrepresented, whereas inconspicuous fungi are often underrepresented, creating biases that must be considered in later analysis.

Type specimens are the most critical records in any fungarium, serving as the official reference material tied to a particular species concept and scientific name. Valid naming practice depends on depositing type material in recognized, publicly accessible collections so that other researchers can examine the reference material.

=== Preservation and storage ===
Specimens are typically housed in light-, water-, and insect-proof cabinets within herbaria or fungaria. After collection, fungal specimens are accessioned and their data recorded, then processed, labelled, mounted, and filed. Preparation commonly includes prompt drying by warm air, silica gel, or freeze drying; large or watery sporocarps may be sliced to hasten drying. Field labels and notes record the collector, date, locality, habitat, substratum or host, and fresh characters, and incoming material is checked for dryness and often disinfested by deep freezing before being packeted or boxed and filed within the collection. Long-term storage ideally relies on climate-controlled conditions, because warm, humid environments increase the risks of mould growth and insect attack. Routine pest management can include monitoring and freezing incoming specimens before they enter the main collection. In some large collections, high-density compactor systems with open-faced cabinets have been used to increase storage capacity two- to threefold over conventional cabinet arrangements while still allowing the closed units to be sealed against insect pests.

Storage methods have varied over time and between institutions. Historical practice included storing flat specimens in folded paper packets attached to herbarium sheets, while bulkier material was often kept in boxes sized to fit the filing system. Specimens may also be stored using nested protective packaging systems; one example is the "Swedish method", in which paper envelopes are placed in cardboard boxes and then in larger rigid boxes. The Muséum national d'histoire naturelle has described varied packaging approaches in its collections, including boxes, envelopes, bound herbarium boards, and specialised slide collections for microscopic groups. The general aim of curation is to preserve both the physical structure needed for morphological study and the chemical integrity required for molecular analysis.

Drying techniques vary: heat drying at 40–50 °C (104–122 °F) typically favours the retention of microscopic structures, while freeze-drying preserves colour and macroscopic form at the cost of increased fragility. For damp or woody material, low-temperature drying with high ventilation helps prevent further fungal growth and may limit DNA damage. Although liquid preservation in alcohol or formalin maintains a specimen's three-dimensional shape, it often results in colour loss and DNA degradation. While liquid preservation in glass containers maintains a specimen's three-dimensional shape, the choice of preservation method involves trade-offs between physical integrity and the suitability of the material for future DNA analysis.

Because many fungi change markedly in appearance during drying, collecting practice has long included recording features of the living fungus through notes and images; the research value of a specimen is increased when such derivative documentation remains linked to the specimen record. Associated material may include field notes, drawings, photographs, spore prints, and permanent slide mounts, and the papers, labels, adhesives, and plastics used in storage are ideally archival quality to limit long-term deterioration. Historically, some curators prepared fleshy fungi as pressed longitudinal sections mounted on herbarium sheets and enclosed in packets, a method that saved space and could preserve gross form better than conventional box-dried specimens; additional dried fragments could be included for later microscopic study. For delicate, fragile, or deliquescent fungi, preservation has sometimes relied on dried sections or illustrations mounted on absorbent paper to retain at least some diagnostic morphological characters.

For each specimen, records commonly include the collector, collection date, locality, identifier, later revisions, and notes on biotope and substrate. For newer specimens, locality data may include geographic coordinates so that collection sites can be revisited. In many collections, specimens are arranged alphabetically by genus and species and tracked in electronic collection databases. No single arrangement scheme is used in all fungaria: smaller collections may be arranged alphabetically by genus and species, whereas larger ones may place specimens in taxonomic order by major groups and then alphabetically within genera; within a species, material may also be arranged by host or geography to aid retrieval. Because higher fungal classification has changed substantially over time, some fungaria have shifted from detailed taxonomic hierarchies to alphabetical arrangement within broader groups, using collection databases to manage retrieval more efficiently. Even detailed digital catalogues and specimen images do not eliminate the need for preserved material, because internal, microscopic, chemical, and genetic characters may still require direct examination, and new analytical methods can reveal characters that were not anticipated when a specimen was first catalogued.

Comparison of common preservation techniques
Method	Structural integrity	DNA suitability	Key limitation
Heat drying	High (microscopic)	High	Shrinkage and distortion of macroscopic form
Freeze drying	High (macroscopic)	High	Extreme fragility; reabsorbs moisture
Liquid preservation	High (three-dimensional form)	Low	Loss of colour; degradation of DNA
Silica-gel sealing	High	High	Requires active monitoring of desiccant condition

== Scientific uses ==
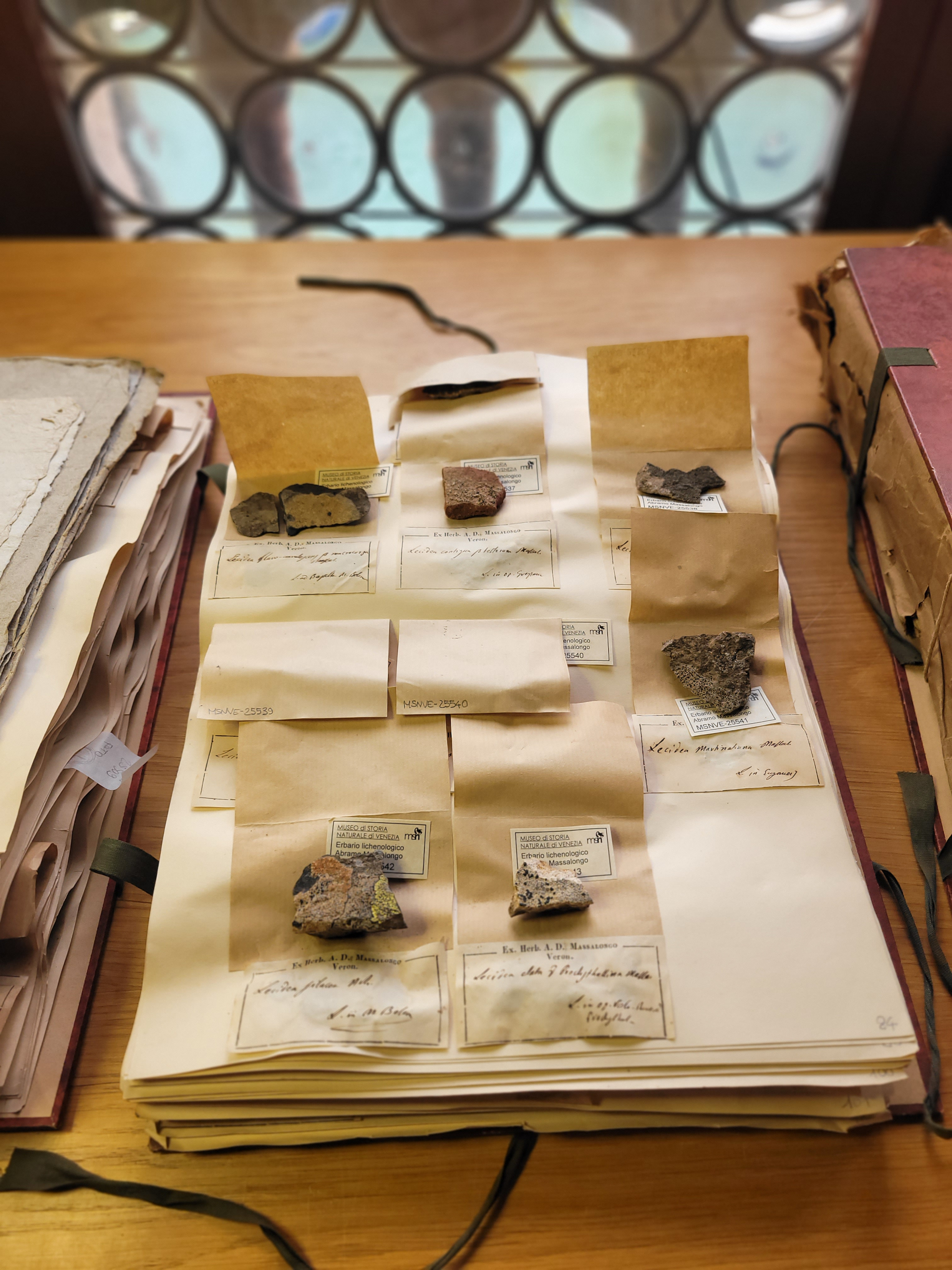
A sheet with some exsiccata of the lichen collection Lichenes Italici Exsiccati, originally assembled by Abramo Bartolommeo Massalongo, and now housed at the Natural History Museum of Venice

Fungarium specimens support many areas of mycological research by providing physical material that can be re-examined to verify identifications and reinterpreted in the light of new methods and concepts. They also have documentary value, allowing older identifications to be checked and historical specimens to be studied using newer methods such as electron microscopy and DNA analysis. In applied fields such as plant pathology and quarantine, fungarium specimens provide checkable evidence for species identifications, host ranges, and geographic distributions. Reference collections have likewise served as authentic catalogues and checklists, providing a stable basis for later identifications and taxonomic comparison. Fungaria serve as essential repositories for "voucher" specimens—physical evidence that anchors a specific scientific study. By preserving the exact material used in research, these collections allow future scientists to verify or correct identifications as taxonomic and molecular methods evolve.

=== Taxonomy and nomenclature ===
Fungaria are central to systematics research based on the comparative study of preserved specimens. Each newly described species must be documented by a designated specimen deposited in a recognized public collection. Type specimens are the only absolute link between a fungal species name and its taxonomic application, and fungaria provide an unmatched source of genetic data from taxonomically authoritative material. Because a type specimen anchors a name rather than representing the full range of a species, accurate identification and revisionary work also depend on examining broader sets of authenticated specimens spanning geography, hosts, and time. In phylogenetic-taxonomic work, sequences from type material are the preferred reference points; when original types are too old to yield reliable DNA, recently collected epitypes may be designated to provide sequence-backed name anchors. Taxonomy in the post-genomic era increasingly relies on sequencing type specimens to anchor species hypotheses, while examination of a broad array of preserved specimens from different growth stages and geographic areas helps define the range of variation within a species. Sampling multiple specimens of the same species can also reveal misidentified material, cryptic species, and species complexes when molecular clusters do not match morphological determinations.

=== Distribution, phenology, and ecology ===
Fungarium records provide a historical record of global biodiversity that can be linked to environmental change. Georeferenced metadata allow researchers to connect specimens to historical climate and land-use databases such as WorldClim. Analysis of collection dates in Europe has revealed delays in the autumnal fruiting season and a general widening of the season for saprotrophic fungi. Specimens have also been used to trace invasive species; for example, the introduction and spread of Amanita phalloides in the western United States was reconstructed using DNA from collections spanning a century. Stable carbon and nitrogen isotope analysis of sporocarps in the genus Ramaria has confirmed their nutritional modes and roles in carbon cycling. Although many historical records lack geographic coordinates or contain only vague locality descriptions, retrospective georeferencing can make older specimens more useful for spatial analyses such as species distribution modelling, provided the associated uncertainty is documented.

=== Conservation ===
Preserved specimens provide essential taxonomic, geographical, and historical evidence for understanding changes in fungal diversity over time and for developing conservation strategies. As habitats are altered or lost, older fungarium specimens may become the only surviving material evidence that particular fungi once occurred in a region. Fungarium records are among the primary sources used in compiling checklists and red list assessments, where conservation priorities depend on evidence of occurrence across time and space. As of 2025, 1,000 fungal species were included on the IUCN Red List. Reliable identification of potentially threatened fungi often requires examining broad sets of specimens across habitats, regions, and growth stages rather than relying on type material alone.

=== DNA barcoding and genomics ===
DNA sequences derived from fungarium specimens can link preserved material to molecular characters used in identification and phylogenetic studies, extending the scientific value of collections beyond traditional morphological characters. Sequencing named fungarium specimens can also expand public reference-sequence databases, improving the interpretation of environmental fungal DNA that would otherwise remain unidentified or only insufficiently identified. DNA in historical specimens is often degraded into short fragments of 40–400 base pairs. Genetic quality is influenced by the specimen's age as well as past exposure to heat, chemicals, or moisture. Consequently, older specimens are less likely to yield uncontaminated internal transcribed spacer (ITS) sequences than more recent collections, often producing DNA from contaminant organisms instead. DNA degradation depends not only on age but also on how specimens were collected, dried, stored, and treated against pests, because historical methods often prioritized preservation of morphology rather than nucleic-acid integrity. Conventional PCR amplification and Sanger sequencing can be difficult or impossible for some specimens, including some type material, owing to fragmentation and contamination by exogenous fungal DNA. In historical fungarium material, contamination can be especially severe because specimens were often stored in close contact on paper sheets or in herbarium packets, increasing the likelihood of cross-contamination, while universal fungal barcode primers may amplify contaminant fungi alongside the target specimen. High-throughput sequencing is better suited to such degraded material. In 2012, researchers reported successful ITS sequencing from a lichen herbarium specimen collected in 1859, then the oldest sequenced fungal herbarium sample. A 2025 study showed that historical lichen specimens, including type material, could be used for whole genome sequencing, allowing genome-wide analysis of both the fungal and algal symbionts. High-throughput sequencing can also recover barcode data from very small amounts of historical material, reducing the need for destructive sampling of valuable specimens while allowing taxonomic re-evaluation of long-preserved collections.

A modified metabarcoding approach using nested, barcoded primers has enabled the cost-effective sequencing of hundreds of specimens simultaneously. In one study, this approach produced ITS sequences for 762 out of 766 macrofungal specimens, with taxonomic identities derived from the sequence data achieving over 90 percent accuracy. Such methods have allowed previously unidentified or misidentified specimens to be recognized under newer taxonomic concepts.

== Digitization and access ==
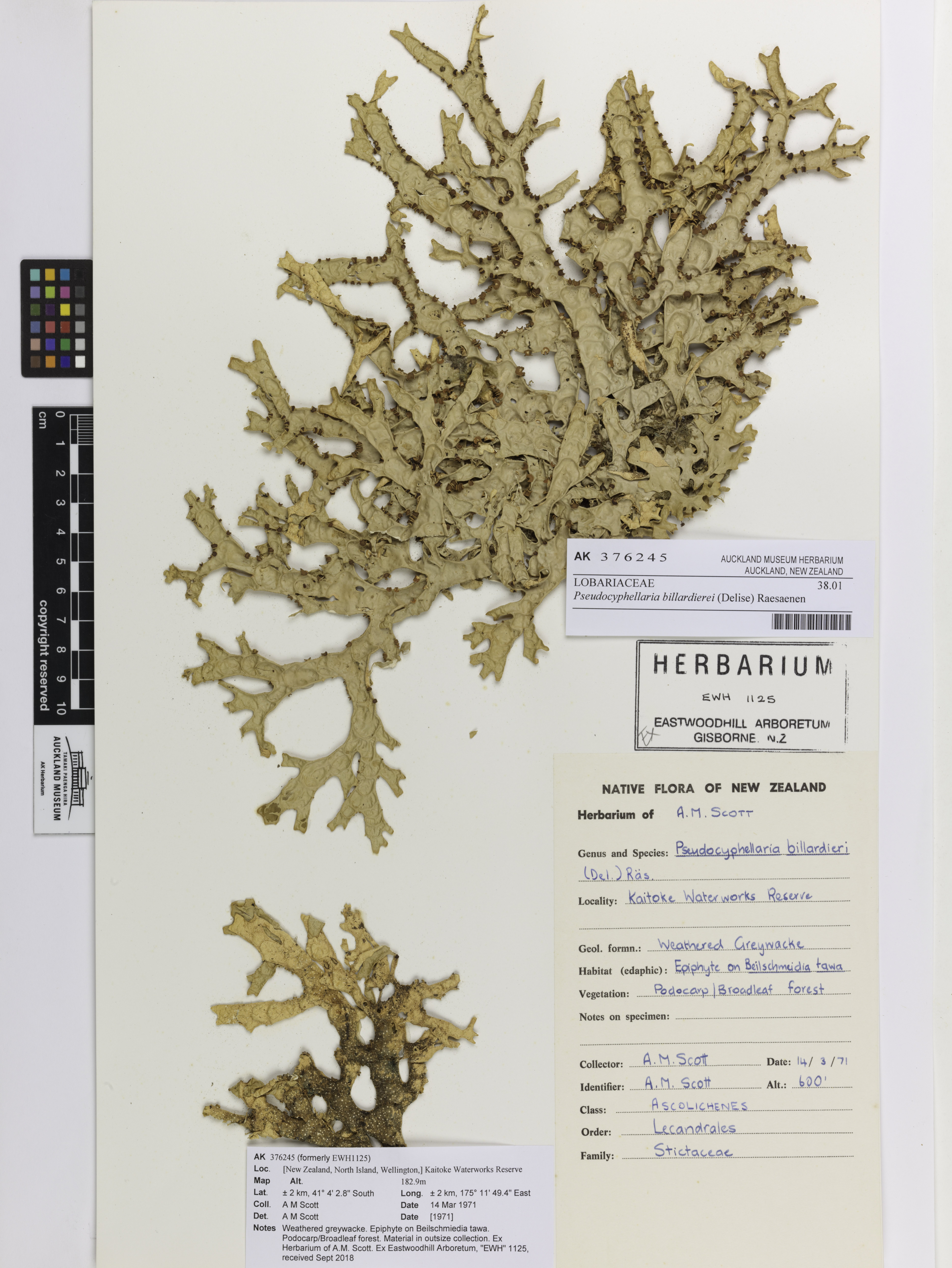
Mounted herbarium specimen of the lichen Pseudocyphellaria billardierei, with collection labels and measurement scales

Large-scale digitization programmes have made fungarium metadata increasingly available for research and public access. Digitization involves transcribing specimen information into structured databases, commonly following the Darwin Core standard maintained by the Biodiversity Information Standards community to support the sharing of biodiversity information. Electronic specimen catalogues increase the usefulness of fungaria by allowing specimens to be queried by attributes such as locality, habitat, morphology, and collector, and they can help identify taxonomic or geographic gaps in the holdings. Databasing fungarium specimens can also reveal discrepancies between literature-based inventories and voucher-backed collections, helping to show where reported diversity is not yet adequately supported by preserved material. Analysis of databased holdings may in turn guide strategic collecting by identifying underrepresented taxa and geographic areas in existing collections. Digitization may also involve retrospective georeferencing, in which textual locality descriptions on older specimen labels are translated into coordinates so that records can be mapped and analysed more effectively.

The Global Biodiversity Information Facility (GBIF) is a global aggregator that uses Darwin Core Archives as a common format for publishing and distributing occurrence datasets derived from specimens and observations. MyCoPortal, described by Miller and Bates as a portal providing access to digitized specimen data from participating fungaria, forms part of a broader effort to make fungal specimen information discoverable online. By 2021, the portal was reported to contain 7,394,281 occurrence records from collections spanning universities, botanic gardens, museums, and government agencies. Linked specimen metadata and sequence data can be aggregated through biodiversity portals such as GBIF, BISON, iDigBio, and MyCoPortal to support mapping, biodiversity research, and the tracking of disease records over time. The Macrofungi Collection Consortium, a National Science Foundation-funded digitization project, resulted in the digitization of approximately 1.25 million United States macrofungal specimens between 2012 and 2017. The AMUNATCOLL project digitized the Szulczewski fungarium and other natural history collections at Adam Mickiewicz University, providing open access to high-quality scans and metadata.

Digitization can be extended by linking specimen records to derivative data such as gene sequences and images, keeping disparate evidence connected to a specimen record over time. Specialized collection portals can also integrate specimen records, images, georeferences, checklists, and synonymy management; for example, the Consortium of Lichen Herbaria reported more than 3.5 million occurrence records from 181 participating institutions and personal collections in 2023. Such systems may use taxonomic thesauri to track accepted names and synonyms and to keep checklists aligned with changing taxonomy. Hardisty and colleagues have proposed the concept of "digital extended specimens" as an infrastructure for linking biodiversity records derived from physical specimens to a broader network of related digital objects and third-party data resources. Digitization improves access to specimen data, but it cannot by itself resolve cryptic diversity, which often requires direct examination and sequencing of preserved material. Despite these advances, many regions, particularly in the tropics, still lag behind in collecting and digitizing fungal diversity.

== Major collections and examples ==
The world's fungal collections are concentrated in Europe and North America, although significant holdings exist elsewhere. Using data from Index Herbariorum, Thiers estimated that 15 to 20 million preserved fungal specimens exist across approximately 3,900 herbaria and fungaria worldwide. Historically, major fungaria were often housed within botanical institutes, plant-protection institutes, museums, and universities rather than existing as stand-alone institutions. Institutions listed in Index Herbariorum are assigned official acronyms, such as K and BPI, which are widely used in specimen numbering and in reference to collections.

Selected major fungaria
Institution	Estimated specimens	Notes
Kew Fungarium (K)	>1,300,000	Representatives of around 60% of known fungal genera; over 50,000 type specimens.
United States National Fungus Collections (BPI)	>1,000,000	Label data for more than 750,000 specimens entered into databases.
National Museum of Natural History, France (PC)	One of the world's largest	Collections include boxes, envelopes, herbarium boards, microscope slides, and historical liquid-preserved material.
Komarov Botanical Institute (LE)	Substantial	Major holdings of fungi and lichens within broader botanical collections.
National Mycological Herbarium (DAOM)	>250,000 (reported 1987)	Canadian fungarium in Ottawa; housed at the Biosystematics Research Centre and described in 1987 as holding over 250,000 specimens.
National Museum, Prague	~420,000	Major Czech fungarium with substantial holdings of non-lichenized fungi, including micromycetes.
Natural History Museum of Denmark (C-F)	~250,000	Particular emphasis on Nordic material.
Father Camille Torrend Herbarium (URM)	~84,500	Described in 2014 as the largest mycological herbarium in South America; established in 1954.

The Kew Fungarium accessions thousands of fungal specimens each year and operates specimen loans and visitor access comparable to a research library for fungal material. Fungaria more generally may provide on-site access and specimen loans for researchers, and their holdings are sometimes used for teaching and exhibitions. Destructive sampling is permitted within limits at Kew to support molecular work, including projects aimed at extracting genomic data from preserved fungi. Even relatively small fungaria may contain substantial undocumented diversity; in a study of the roughly 14,000-specimen Larry F. Grand Mycological Herbarium, molecular re-examination of powdery mildew specimens led to widespread redeterminations and the recognition of four previously undescribed species.

== Challenges and limitations ==
Preserved collections do not encompass all fungal diversity, and many fungal species may never be documented by preserved specimens, particularly when they remain embedded in substrates or do not produce identifiable structures for collection. As a comparatively "hidden" group, fungi are more difficult to collect than plants or animals; whereas herbarium specimens often preserve both vegetative and reproductive parts, fungaria are usually limited to reproductive sporocarps. A significant proportion of fungal biodiversity, estimated at 1.5 to 6 million species, remains unnamed and undocumented.

The scientific usefulness of fungarium data can be limited by taxonomic and geographic sampling biases, including strong overrepresentation of some fungal groups and biases linked to human population density and collecting patterns. At global scale, preserved-specimen data remain concentrated in Europe, North America, and Australia and are strongly skewed toward Ascomycota, owing to persistent geographic and taxonomic biases in collecting effort. Interpretation of historical collection data can also be complicated by collecting bias, since specimens were not gathered randomly and many regions remain underrepresented. Large fractions of fungarium holdings may remain unidentified or bear outdated identifications, creating barriers to using collections effectively at scale.

The main technical challenge for molecular work is the degradation of DNA over time through deamination and fragmentation. Historical preservation methods focused on morphology and often used heat or chemicals that were detrimental to molecular integrity. Molecular work on historical specimens can also be constrained by limited specimen material and by institutional policies on destructive sampling, especially for type specimens.

Institutional challenges include dwindling financial support, which has led some facilities to downsize or close; for instance, Duke University announced the dissolution of its herbarium in 2024. As funding shifts away from traditional natural history, many collections are being relocated to large, centralised repositories. Beyond financial instability, neglected collections face physical threats from pests such as the herbarium beetle (Trogoderma angustum), which can destroy centuries of accumulated biological data if not strictly managed.

== See also ==
- Conservation and restoration of herbaria
- Dermestarium
- Virtual herbarium
