= Herbar Digital =

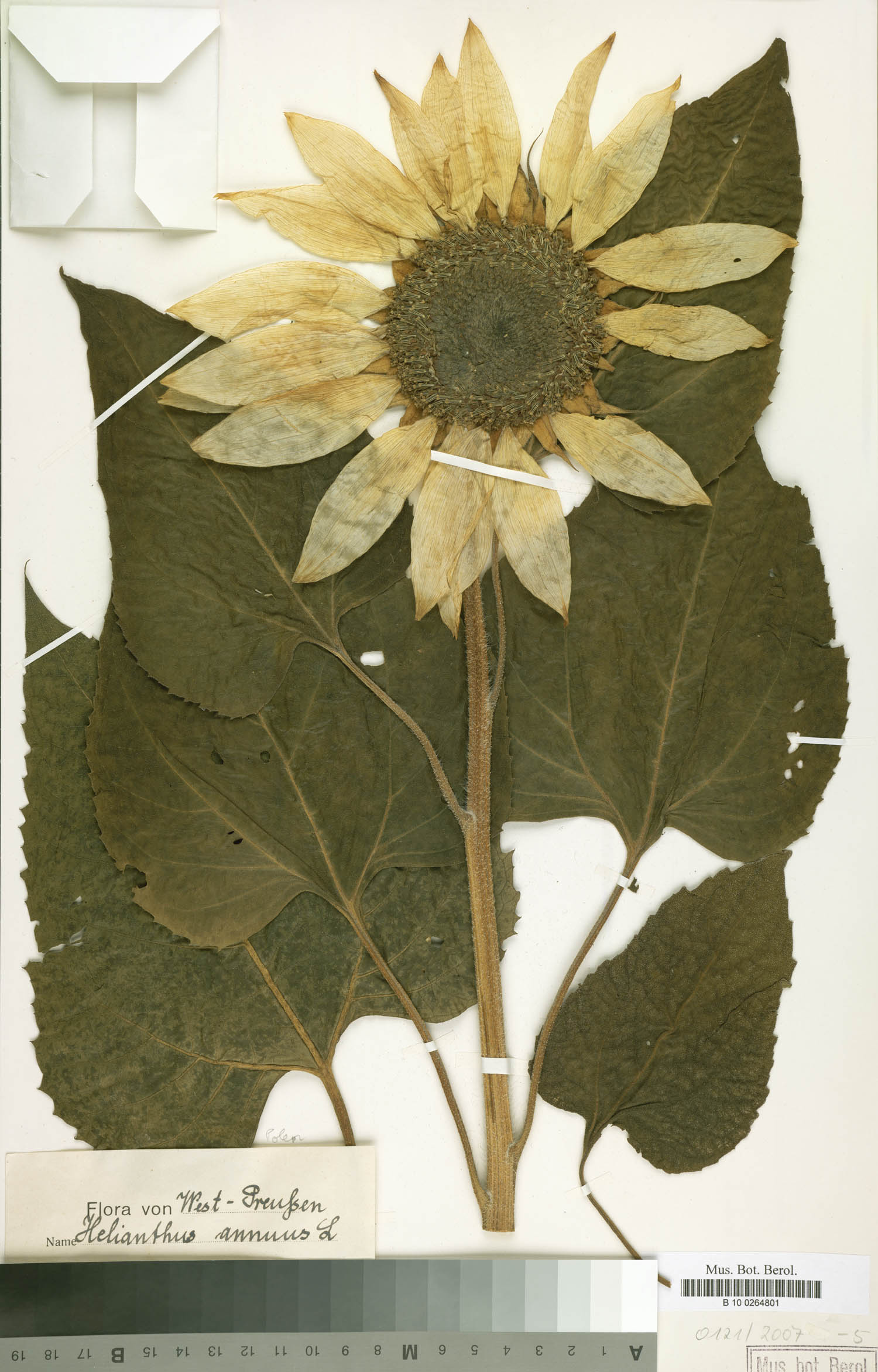
Reduced example image: Helianthus annus Original: SilverFast HDR files (ca. 180MB, 6100x9600 pixels)

Herbar Digital is a research project at the Fachhochschule Hannover (FHH) from 2006 to 2011 for rationalising the virtualization of botanical document material and their usage by process optimization and automation.

== Research project ==
Conservatively estimated, 500 million dried plants — so called herbar specimens — are stored in herbariums at botanic gardens across the world under scientifically controlled conditions. The aim of the third-party-funds financed research project is to automate the process of virtualization of herbar specimens and their management to make them digitally accessible to botanists and biologists. An exemplary solution for the example herbarium of the botanic Garden in Berlin-Dahlem (ca. 3.5 million plant specimens) will allow to generalize the applied structure, software and technique to a level from that general reference solutions for efficient high-resolution scanning of any object of museum quality can be derived.

== Workflow ==
Herbar specimens have been scanned for some time at different spaces. However, the degree of automation of these solutions is very low, so that only a small number of herbarium specimens can be scanned each day. The University of Applied Sciences and Arts in Hannover has analysed industrial production workflows and derived approaches for scanning herbarium specimens. Automation is divided into three development focus points:

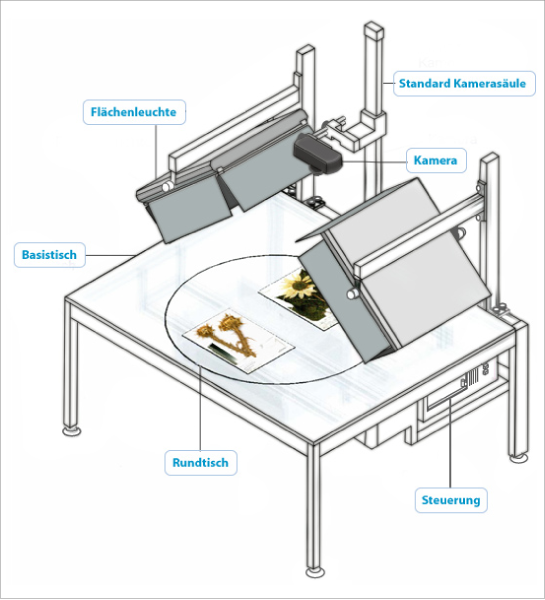
Herbar Digital base table

1. Scanner–workplace with control mode,
2. Technology management for scanning,
3. System solutions taking staff into account.

The herbar specimens get scanned to RAW data with a scanner camera attached to a standard personal computer and stored on a server using SilverFast Ai software. Image optimization (color, contrast, and brightness) is done on a second computer with SilverFast HDR software. The post processed RAW files get converted in a suitable image format, controlled at a profiled graphic screen and stored back on the server.

A base unit is suited for paper sizes from DIN A3 to DIN A2 and is equipped with panel lights, a standard camera column and a scanner camera. The use of a controlled rotary indexing table provides new possibilities to improve performance. The rotary indexing table allows a new herbarium specimen to be loaded while another one is scanned. Access is also much easier, as the herbarium specimens are not reloaded directly under the panel lights. Apart from the time needed for scanning and turning the table 180°, the user determines the timing of the machine (3–12 rpm). The rotary indexing table can be controlled with a standard PC connected through a USB port. The scanner software is also installed on this computer. The rotary indexing table can be accessed from this computer without any problems using Herbar Digital Control software (HDC).

== Project partners ==
- Herbar specimen: Botanischer Garten und Botanisches Museum Berlin-Dahlem
- Development of the automating: Fachhochschule Hannover
- Technology management and scanner software: LaserSoft Imaging
- Hardware for digitization: Kaiser Fototechnik, Pentacon and Quato
- Control and systems engineering: isel
- Simulation: DELMIA

== See also ==
- Botanic Garden and Botanical Museum Berlin-Dahlem, Freie Universität Berlin
- Herbarium
- Virtual herbarium
