= Linnaean Herbarium =

Historical plant specimen collection assembled by Carl Linnaeus

The Linnaean Herbarium (herbarium code: LINN) is a historically significant collection of over 13,000 dried plant and lichen specimens assembled by the Swedish taxonomist Carl Linnaeus (1707–1778). Housed at the Linnean Society of London since 1828 (and at its current location in Burlington House since 1873), it forms the foundation of modern botanical nomenclature and serves as the primary reference for Linnaeus's 1753 work Species Plantarum, the starting point for modern plant taxonomy. The herbarium includes specimens from Linnaeus's botanical explorations and global collaborations, spanning early Swedish collections to acquisitions from the Americas, Asia, and Africa.

The collection, begun during Linnaeus's student days, expanded considerably during his time in the Netherlands and England. After Linnaeus's death, his son inherited the herbarium, which was sold to English botanist James Edward Smith in 1784. Smith's acquisition and subsequent founding of the Linnean Society of London advanced the Linnaean system globally. The herbarium's organisation remains largely as Linnaeus's son left it in 1783, offering context for interpreting Linnaeus's specific names.

The Linnaean Herbarium is a primary resource for botanical research and for the study of 18th-century scientific practice. Ongoing preservation, documentation, and digitisation initiatives have increased access to the collection for researchers. The herbarium continues to be used in modern botanical nomenclature, as it provides original material or historical context for approximately 5,900 specific names published by Linnaeus. Its continued use in projects such as the Linnaean Plant Name Typification Project reflects its sustained role in contemporary botanical research.

== History and significance ==
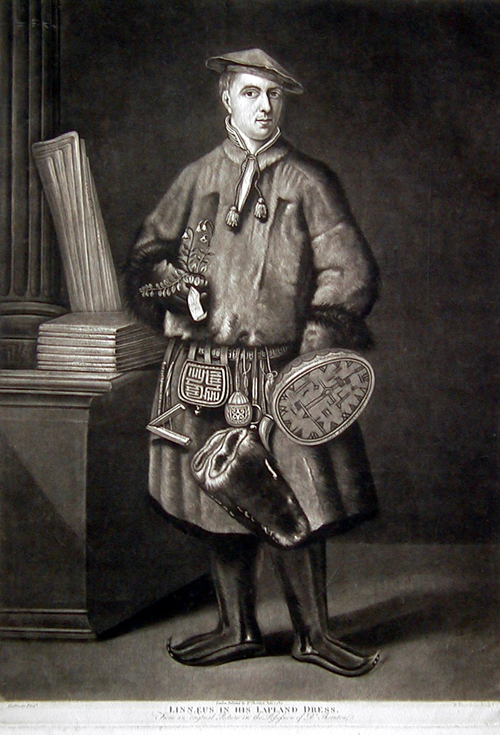
A depiction of Carl Linnaeus upon his return from Lapland in 1737

Linnaeus started his herbarium as a student at Lund University in 1727–28, collecting about 600 Swedish plants by autumn 1729. The collection grew significantly during his time in Holland and England (1735–38), where he acquired specimens from Virginia, the West Indies, Central America, and various gardens. This period was vital for his botanical development, as he obtained specimens from diverse sources, including George Clifford's garden and John Clayton's Virginian collection (via Johann Gronovius). Linnaeus avidly collected specimens during his 1732 Lapland journey (where he named Linnaea borealis) and trips to Öland, Gotland, and Skåne. He also cultivated plants in the Uppsala Garden from seeds sent from various regions. Despite travel challenges and preservation difficulties, Linnaeus's collections formed the foundation for his extensive botanical work. His network of students, colleagues, and correspondents, including Torbern Bergman, Erik Brander, Johann Reinhold Forster, Pehr Osbeck, Johann Christian Daniel von Schreber, Anders Sparrman, and Domenico Vandelli, contributed specimens from around the world, further enriching his herbarium.

Linnaeus pioneered the practice of keeping herbaria unbound, storing dried plant sheets separately in purpose-built cabinets. This innovation facilitated easy addition, removal, and reorganisation of specimens, significantly influencing 18th-century botanical study methods. His herbarium cabinets were designed to store unbound sheets of dried plants. The specimen paper was relatively small, 12.3 by 8 inches (32 cm x 20.56 cm), and often provided scant information about the collector and collection details. Linnaeus relied on memory, using brief notes or signs to remind himself of a specimen's source.

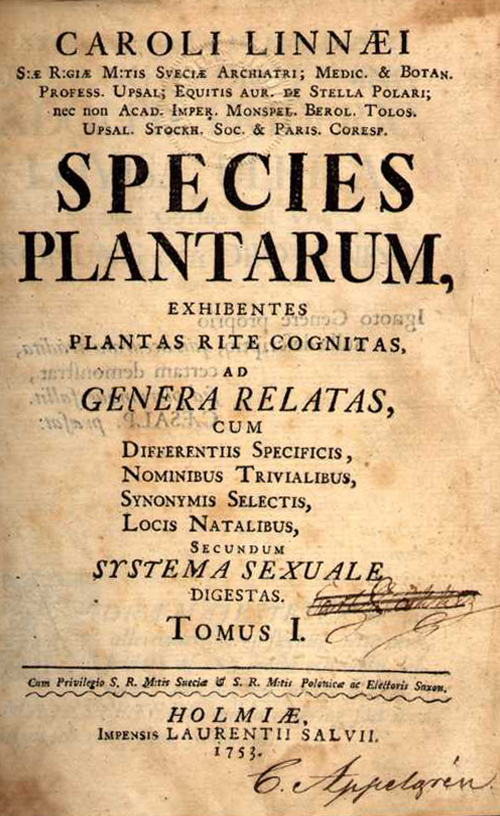
Cover page of Species Plantarum, 1753

By 1753, when Linnaeus published Species Plantarum, the herbarium included specimens from southern France, other parts of Europe, Siberia, coastal China, India, southeastern Canada, New York, and Pennsylvania. After 1753, Linnaeus added specimens from South America, Jamaica, China, and the Cape of Good Hope. Lists from 1753, 1755, and 1767 provide some insight into the herbarium's contents, but the collection was not static. Linnaeus continually added to it, and it also suffered losses over the years, making it difficult to identify all original specimens.

After Linnaeus's death in 1778, his herbarium passed to his son, Carl Linnaeus the Younger. When the Carl Linnaeus the Younger died in 1783, the herbarium was sold to English botanist James Edward Smith, fulfilling Linnaeus's wishes. This sale has been a source of regret for Swedish botanists ever since. While the main herbarium went to England, many Linnaean specimens stayed in Sweden. These specimens were often gifts from Linnaeus to friends and disciples. For example, about 30 plants classified by Linnaeus are in the Bergian herbarium at the Royal Swedish Academy of Sciences. Carl Linnaeus the Younger also had his own herbarium, including plants he collected and some from his father. After his death, part of this collection (the 'Herbarium parvum') was given to Baron Clas Alströmer, and eventually became part of the Swedish Museum of Natural History collections. Linnaeus organised his herbarium by genera, species, and classes, with specific names written outside. Each species was glued to a half-sheet of paper, and all half-sheets of the same genus were placed in a whole sheet with the genus name on it.

In December 1783, Sara Elisabeth Moræa, Linnaeus's widow, offered to sell his collection to Sir Joseph Banks for 1000 guineas. Banks declined but advised James Edward Smith, a young medical student, who then purchased the herbarium and manuscripts in 1784. The collection, which included three cabinets of herbarium sheets, was shipped to England. According to an illustration in Robert John Thornton's New Illustration Of The Sexual System Of Linnaeus, published during the Napoleonic Wars, the collection's transport to England involved a dramatic pursuit by a Swedish vessel, though this detail may be part of a manufactured narrative celebrating Britain's acquisition of the collections. The acquisition of the collection marked a significant moment in natural history, as it provided the material and social basis for the advancement of the Linnaean system in Britain. Smith founded the Linnean Society of London in 1788, initially meeting at his residence where the collections were housed in their original storage cabinets. These cabinets, though later returned to Sweden, had played a crucial role in preserving the specimens in their original arrangement.

Smith's botanical education began in Norwich with local botanists like Hugh Rose, who introduced him to Linnaeus's works. He later studied at Edinburgh under John Hope, the first to teach the Linnaean system in Scotland. Smith's deep interest in botany and his acquisition of Linnaeus's collections significantly influenced botanical research and education in Britain. Smith extensively used the Linnaean collections in his publications, including English Botany (1790–1814) and Flora Britannica (1800–1804). These publications advanced botanical knowledge and served as valuable references for future taxonomic studies. Smith's ownership of the collections was not without controversy; he was accused by some contemporaries of appropriating Linnaeus's work and passing it off as his own. However, Smith viewed himself as a 'trustee' or 'steward' of national treasures.

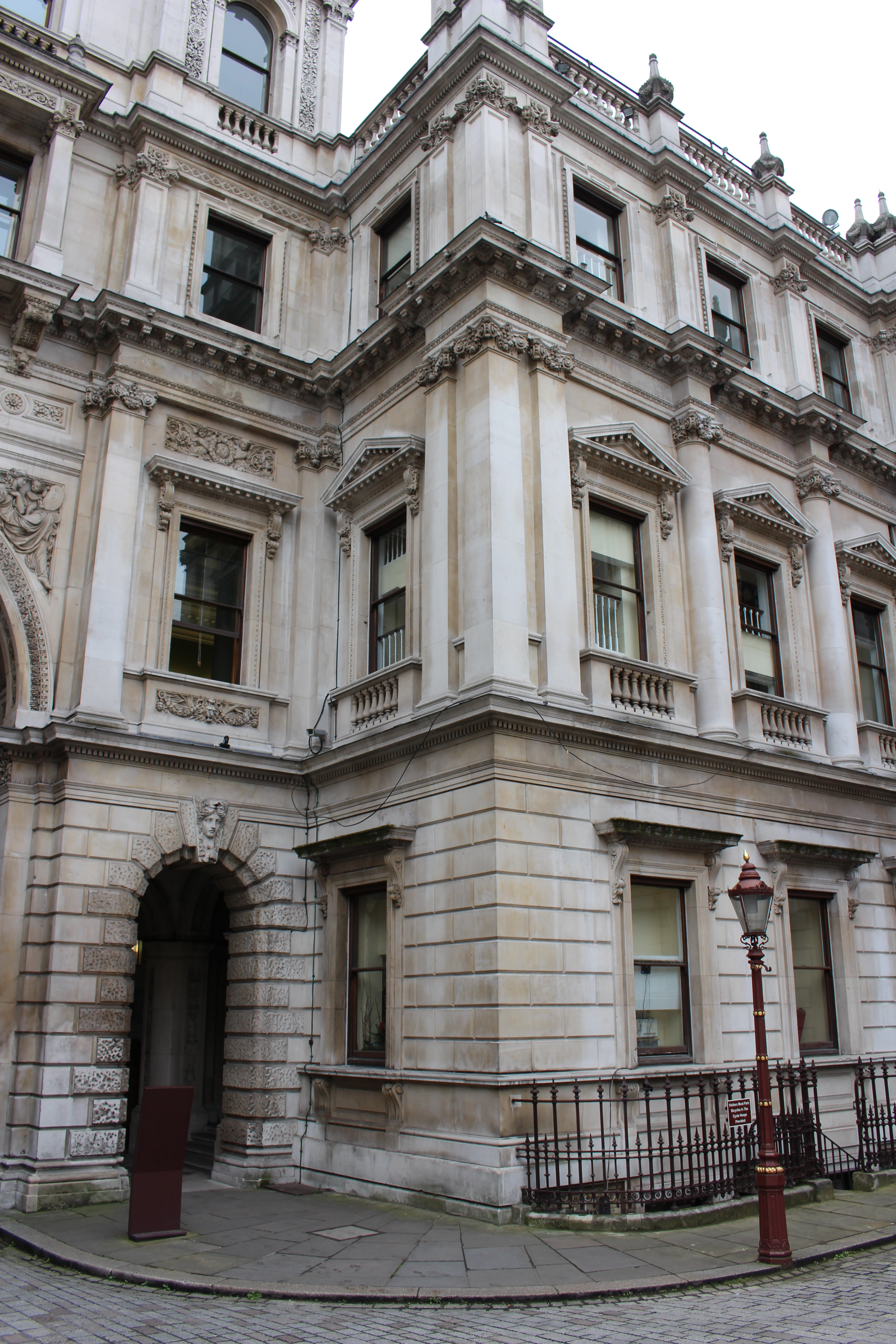
The Linnaean Herbarium is kept by the Linnean Society of London, housed at Burlington House in Piccadilly

Since 1873, the Linnaean Herbarium has been housed by the Linnean Society of London at Burlington House in Piccadilly, following the Society's move to its current location in the South West portion of the courtyard. Prior to this, from 1856 to 1873, it was housed in Old Burlington House. Contrary to belief, it was not gifted or bequeathed to the Society. The Society bought it from the executors of Sir James Edward Smith (1759–1828) to make its contents permanently available to botanical scholars.

The Linnaean Herbarium is fundamental to modern botanical nomenclature, as Linnaeus's 1753 work Species Plantarum serves as the internationally accepted starting point. It provides essential context for interpreting approximately 5,900 Linnaean specific names published in this work.

Linnaeus's pioneering work in botanical data management involved innovative paper-based technologies to handle information overload. He used interleaved books, index cards, and systematic filing systems to catalogue species and maintain extensive notes on various genera. His annotations included details on the medicinal and economic uses of plants, reflecting his broader goal of utilizing natural resources efficiently. Linnaeus's extensive correspondence network across Europe and beyond was important for expanding his collections and updating classifications. His work was foundational for botanical taxonomy and had significant practical applications in agriculture, medicine, and other industries.

== Contents ==
According to Benjamin Daydon Jackson, the Linnaean Herbarium contains 13,832 plant sheets, and several zoological specimens. These specimens represent species from every continent, contributed by about 150 individuals. The herbarium's organisation largely reflects how Linnaeus's son left it in 1783. Specimens are arranged by genus, each given a number. Within each genus, individual sheets are numbered sequentially. Linnaeus designed functional herbarium cabinets with adjustable shelving, allowing for dynamic and flexible organisation to accommodate new discoveries and rearrangements. Specimens are usually authenticated by a number corresponding to the species in the first edition of Species Plantarum (1753). Linnaeus used a unique system to mark specimens acquired after Species Plantarum. Species collected up to the 10th edition of Systema Naturae (1759) were marked with capital letters. The second edition of Species Plantarum (1762–63) introduced a new numbering system, which was not applied to the herbarium. The herbarium is internationally recognised by its standard herbarium code LINN, which is used to uniquely identify this collection in scientific literature and databases.

== Comparison with other historical herbaria ==
Linnaeus's innovative approach to specimen management can be better understood compared to other historical collections of the era. Unlike earlier herbaria bound into fixed volumes, Linnaeus's cabinets allowed easy reorganisation and expansion. This innovation provided a model for later herbaria, emphasizing flexibility and adaptability in botanical classification. The Linnaean Herbarium shares similarities with other pre-Linnaean and early 18th-century collections, such as those of William Sherard, Hans Sloane, Paul Hermann, and Francesco Cupani. These collections, like the Linnaean Herbarium, contain specimens from various parts of the world, reflecting the global nature of botanical exploration at the time. However, the Linnaean Herbarium is notable for its larger size and comprehensive scope. It contains about 13,000 specimens, a significant increase compared to other collections of the period. For instance, the herbarium of Paolo Boccone (1633–1704) in Leiden contains 669 samples, Sherard's herbarium has about 20,000 specimens, and Cupani's collection comprises 669 samples focused on Sicilian flora.

The mounting methods used in these herbaria are also comparable. Linnaeus and contemporaries like Sloane and Hermann used strips of paper and glue to mount specimens. Unlike some other collections that underwent significant rearrangements over time, the Linnaean Herbarium remains largely in its original form, making it a particularly valuable resource for understanding 18th-century botanical practices.

The influence of the Linnaean Herbarium extended beyond Europe, with some specimens reaching the United States. In 1794, David Hosack acquired one of the few Linnaean specimen collections in America, obtaining duplicates from James Edward Smith during his London studies. These specimens became part of a larger herbarium eventually incorporated into the Lyceum of Natural History's collections. This collection, last recorded in 1830, is believed to have been destroyed in a fire in 1866, though this is not conclusively proven. The loss of Hosack's collection, if confirmed, represents a significant setback for early American botanical studies. Few other Linnaean specimens are known to exist in the United States, including a specimen in the Muhlenberg Herbarium at the Academy of Natural Sciences of Philadelphia and fragments in Asa Gray's herbarium at Harvard University.

== Conservation and access ==
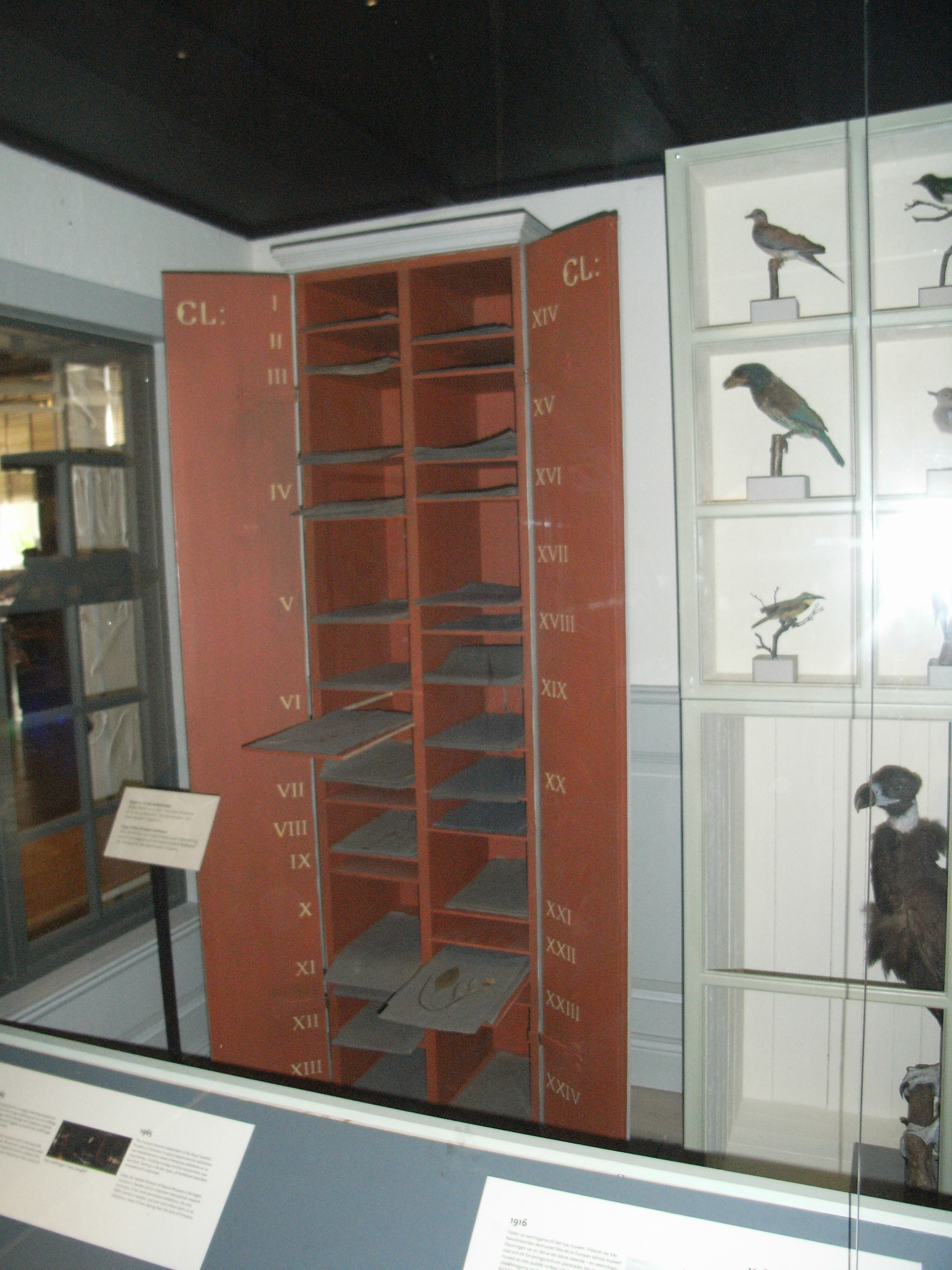
Copy of the Linnaeus Herbarium in the Swedish Museum of Natural History. The cabinet has spaces for each of the 24 Plantae "Regnum Vegetabile" classes.

The herbarium faced several risks before Smith acquired it. In 1766, a fire in Uppsala led Linnaeus to move his herbarium and library to a barn, and later to a specially built museum at Hammarby. This exposed the collection to damp and mould, causing further damage. The younger Linnaeus also reported damage by mice and insects. Despite these challenges, the collection was preserved and later restored.

Due to its immense scientific and historical value, the Linnaean Herbarium is now carefully preserved in a temperature- and humidity-controlled environment beneath Burlington House in London. These conditions ensure long-term preservation of the specimens, making them accessible for ongoing research. The Linnean Society has undertaken various efforts to document and make the collection more accessible to researchers worldwide.

Efforts to catalog and study the Linnaean Herbarium in detail date back to at least the mid-20th century. Spencer Savage's 1945 A Catalogue of the Linnaean Herbarium was a significant early work. In 1941, a microfilm of the herbarium was made with support from the Carnegie Foundation. In 1958–59, a more detailed photographic record was created in collaboration with the International Documentation Centre AB, Sweden, available in microfiche form. These efforts have ensured that high-quality, detailed images of the specimens are available for study, even outside the Linnean Society's rooms.

A example of a comprehensive modern effort to catalogue and typify Linnaean plant names is Charlie Jarvis's Order Out of Chaos: Linnaean Plant Names and Their Types, published in 2007. This work represents 25+ years of research and collaboration with hundreds of botanists worldwide, containing type specimens for over 9000 plants named by Linnaeus and adhering to the International Code of Botanical Nomenclature.

The entire Linnaean collections encompass 14,000 plant specimens, 158 fish specimens, 1,564 shells, 3,198 insects, 1,600 books, and 3,000 letters and documents. These items are available for viewing by appointment, and a guided tour is offered monthly.

The Linnean Society of London has made the Linnaean Herbarium accessible online, allowing researchers worldwide to study the specimens digitally. The herbarium is searchable by genus and by historical 'filed as' names. Specimens are cataloged using the Savage numbering system. The digital database includes names written by Linnaeus and his son, as well as some subsequent determinations, but does not include transcriptions of all annotations. Researchers seeking currently accepted names are directed to resources such as the Natural History Museum's Linnaean Plant Name Typification Project, Tropicos, or the International Plant Names Index (IPNI). The Linnean Society welcomes current determinations of specimens and encourages the use of these collections for scientific and historical research.

=== Cataloging and digital presentation ===
Digitising of the Linnaean Herbarium is an essential step in preserving and democratising access to this scientific resource. High-resolution digital images and comprehensive metadata enable global researchers worldwide to study Linnaeus's original specimens without risking damage to these fragile historical artifacts, safeguarding the collection for future generations and facilitating new research and collaboration among botanists worldwide. The digitisation process captures detailed information to aid researchers. The Swedish Museum of Natural History provides the following details with their digital images of Linnaean specimens:

1. Name: The original Linnaean basionym, without modern synonyms.
2. Type status: Indication of whether the specimen is a lectotype, neotype, etc.
3. Microfiche number: Corresponding to the IDC (International Documentation Centre) microfiche numbers used for cataloguing.
4. Reference: For type specimens, a citation of the type designator and place of publication.
5. Type herbarium number: A unique identifier for each Linnaean type specimen in the collection.

This level of detail in digital catalogs helps researchers identify and verify Linnaean specimens, facilitating ongoing taxonomic and historical botanical research. It highlights the importance of Linnaean specimens as type material for plant names, underlining their continued relevance in modern botany. The herbarium sheets may also include symbols used by Linnaeus, providing additional historical context and insight into his working methods.

=== Ongoing research ===
The Linnaean Plant Name Typification Project, initiated by the Linnean Society of London, remains at the forefront of Linnaean Herbarium research. This project aims to provide a comprehensive catalogue of type designations for all Linnaean plant names, necessary for clarifying their application in botanical nomenclature.

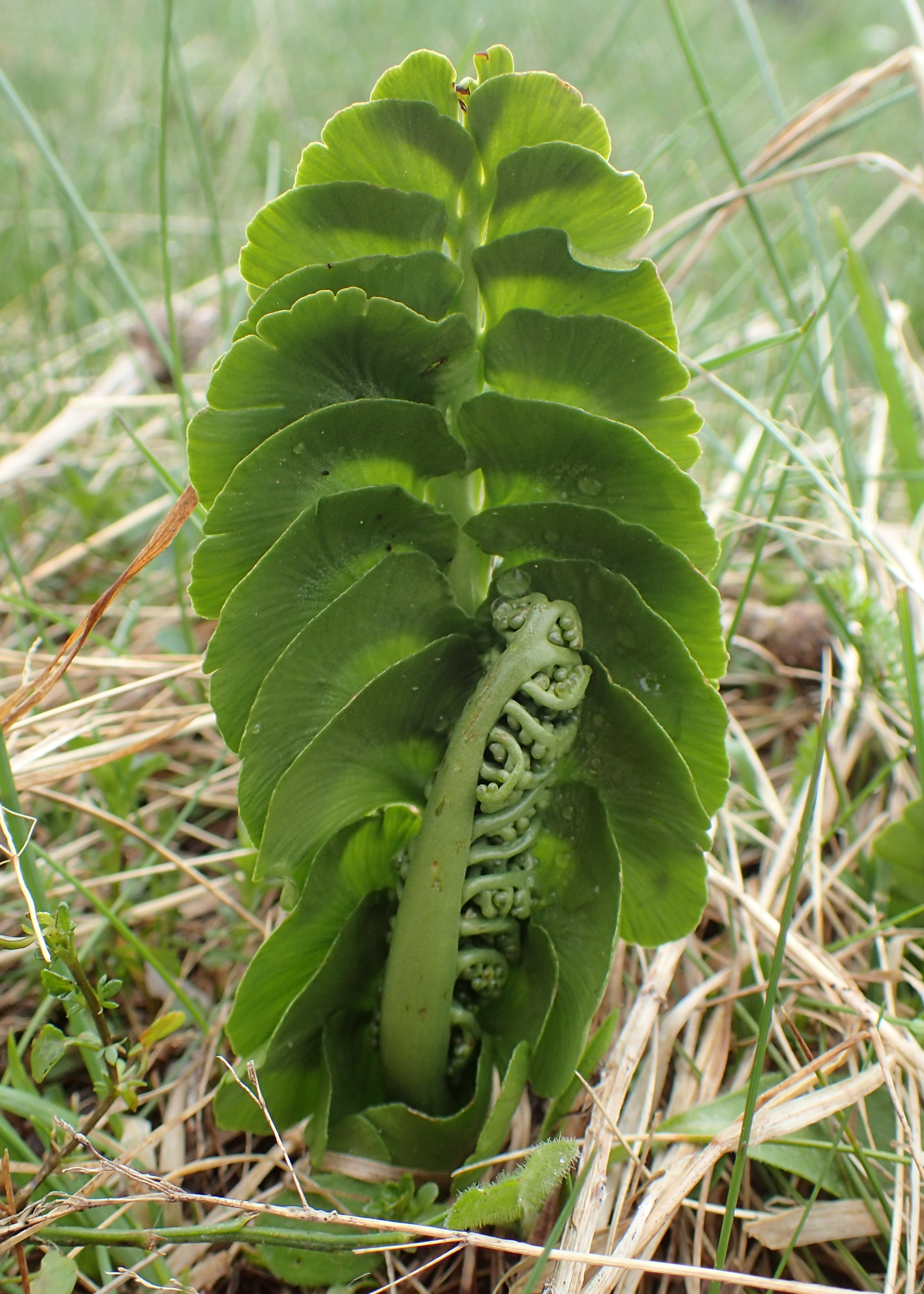
Botrychium lunaria (common moonwort), first described by Linnaeus as Osmunda lunaria in 1753

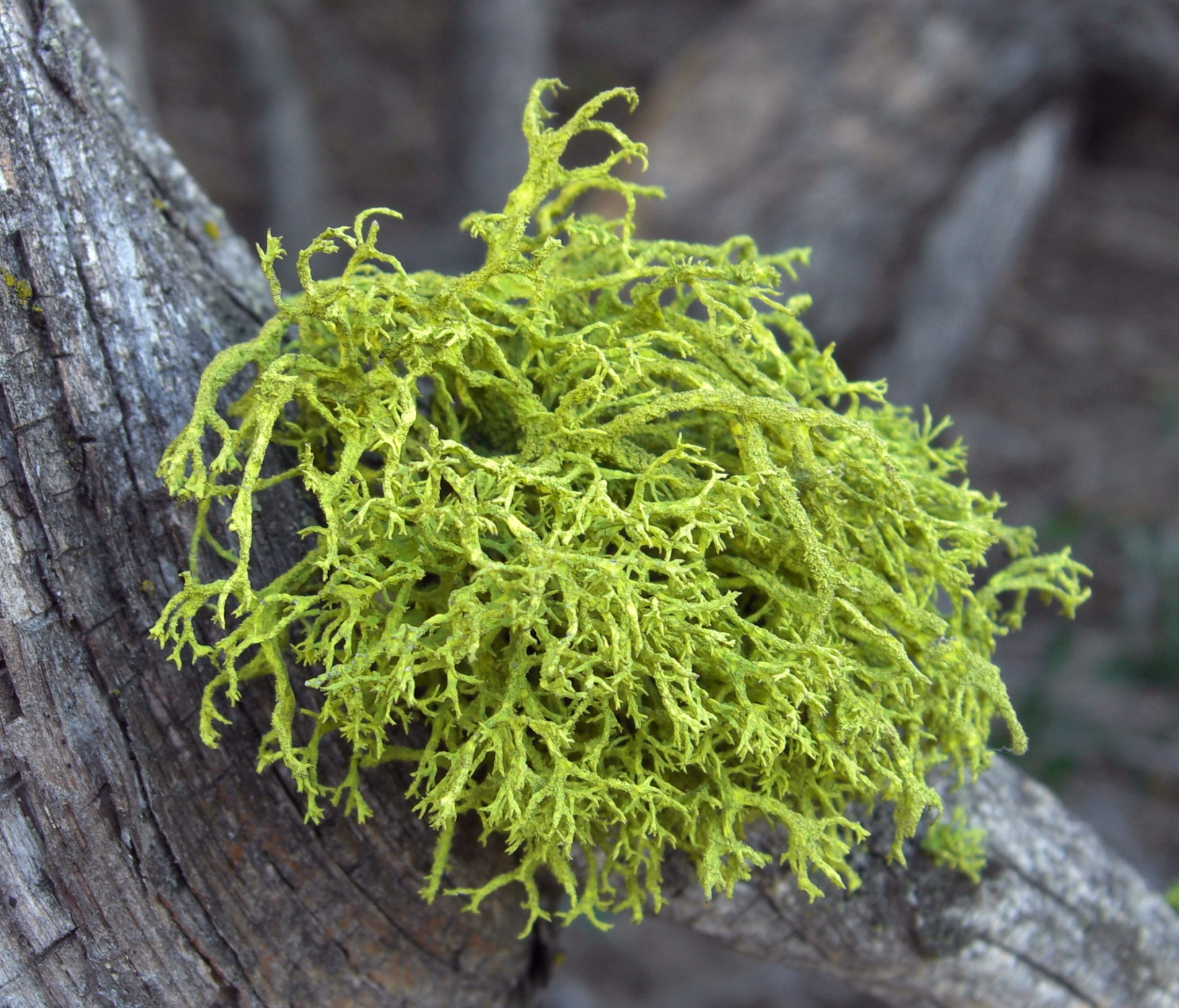
Letharia vulpina, originally named Lichen vulpinus by Linnaeus.

In 2003, the project launched an online database with typification details for all Linnaean plant names. This resource provides information on place of publication, stated provenance, type specimens or illustrations, and current taxonomic placement for each name. By the early 2000s, valid, published typifications were known for more than 75% of Linnaean plant names. The project has published numerous papers with hundreds of new typifications and assisted scientists worldwide in publishing typifications for Linnaean names. For example, the common moonwort fern was originally named Osmunda lunaria by Linnaeus in his 1753 Species Plantarum. Through typification research, botanists determined that the definitive specimen (lectotype) that Linnaeus used to describe this species is preserved in the Clifford Herbarium at London's Natural History Museum. In 1801, the botanist Olof Swartz transferred the species to a different genus, creating the new combination Botrychium lunaria (L.) Swartz, with the '(L.)' indicating that Linnaeus provided the original species name (basionym).

The Linnaean lichen names have been a subject of extensive research and typification efforts. In 1994, Per Magnus Jørgensen and colleagues conducted a comprehensive study of Linnaeus' lichen herbarium, which is housed alongside his plant specimens at the Linnean Society of London and contains 324 sheets with 109 lichen taxa. They found that Linnaeus' treatment of lichens was somewhat arbitrary, reflecting his limited interest in the group. The authors' work involved examination of original specimens, illustrations, and Linnaeus' writings to establish lectotypes and epitypes for these names, often navigating complex issues of interpretation and nomenclature. This research led to a proposal to reject or conserve 26 Linnaean names for lichen-forming fungi.

Researchers working with the Linnaean Herbarium face persistent challenges, particularly in interpreting Linnaeus's handwriting. His hurried script, especially in later annotations, can be difficult to decipher, adding complexity to the process of accurately cataloging and interpreting the specimens.

== Legacy ==
The Linnaean Herbarium remains an important resource for botanical research, especially in taxonomy and the history of botany. It provides invaluable insights into Linnaeus's work and the development of plant classification systems. As Stearn notes, "The Linnaean Herbarium from its world-wide scope has a world-wide interest", and its availability in microfiche form represents "a major service to systematic botany". Linnaeus's method of keeping herbarium sheets unbound in cabinets allowed for a flexible and dynamic system of botanical classification. This approach has influenced modern botanical practices, where the type method and the concept of holotypes are now standard. Linnaeus's insistence on detailed descriptions and comparisons of multiple specimens laid the groundwork for the taxonomic methods used today.

== Other Linnaean herbaria ==
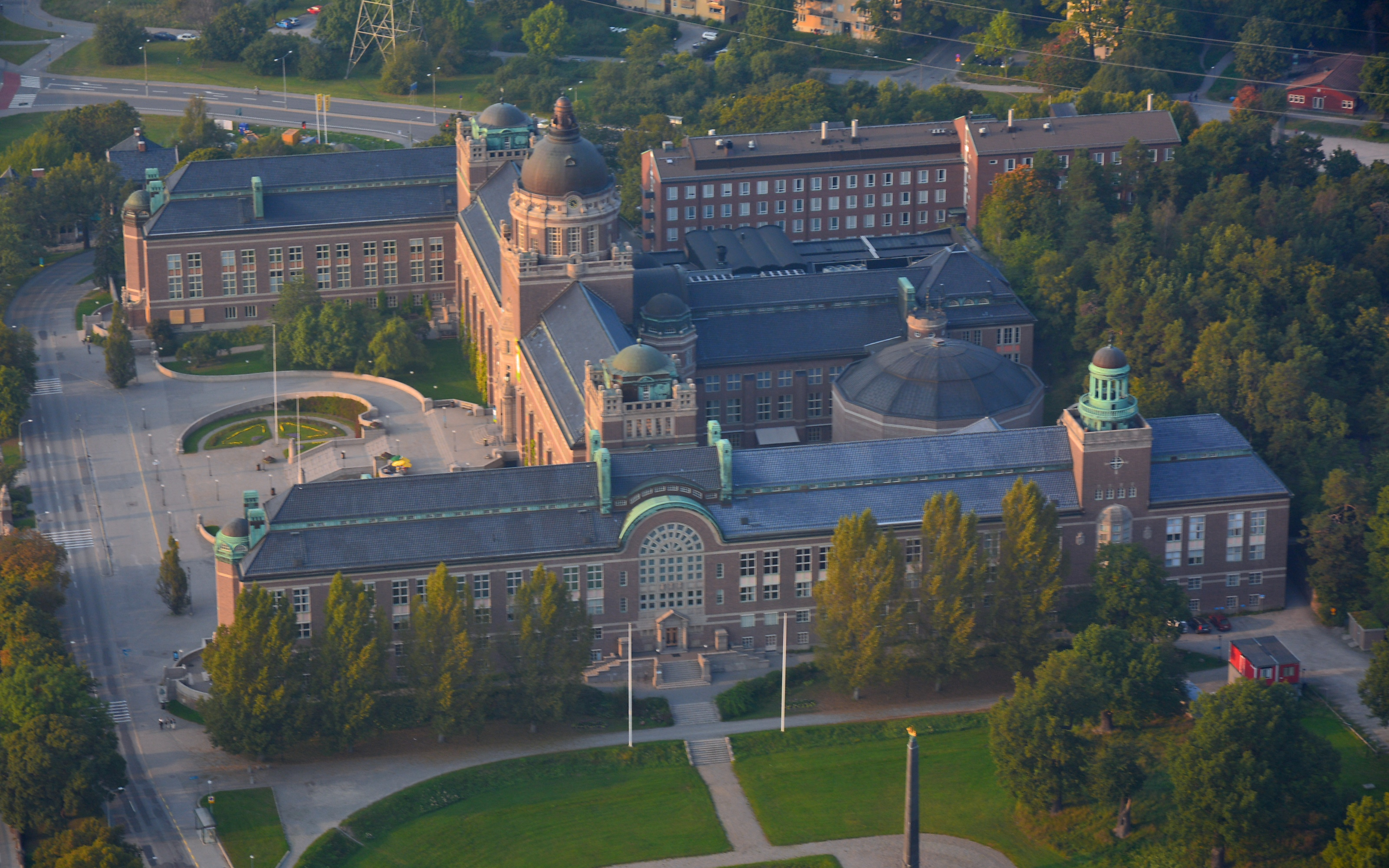
The Swedish Museum of Natural History in Stockholm houses thousands of Linnaean specimens.

While the main Linnaean Herbarium is housed at the Linnean Society of London, other significant collections of Linnaean specimens exist elsewhere. These additional collections emerged from Linnaeus's practice of sharing specimens with colleagues and students and the dispersal of his collections after his death. These herbaria, though smaller than the main collection in London, are significant because they often contain type specimens and provide additional context for Linnaeus's work. They offer researchers alternative sources for studying Linnaean material, potentially filling gaps in the main collection or providing comparative specimens for taxonomic studies. A notable example is the Linnaean herbarium at the Swedish Museum of Natural History in Stockholm, comprising approximately 4,000 specimens.

These specimens were originally distributed by Linnaeus to his disciples and eventually became part of the collections of the Royal Swedish Academy of Sciences, before being transferred to the Swedish Museum of Natural History. Many of these specimens are types that have been formally designated by various experts.

Efforts have been made to digitise and make these collections more accessible. Since 1997, the Swedish Museum of Natural History has worked to present images of these specimens on their web server, aiming to eventually include images of all sheets in their Linnaean collection. These additional Linnaean collections accentuate the widespread influence of Linnaeus's work and the dispersal of his specimens during and after his lifetime.

== See also ==
- Conservation and restoration of herbaria
- Exsiccata
- List of herbaria
- List of herbaria in Europe
