= Virtual herbarium =

Herbarium in a digitized form

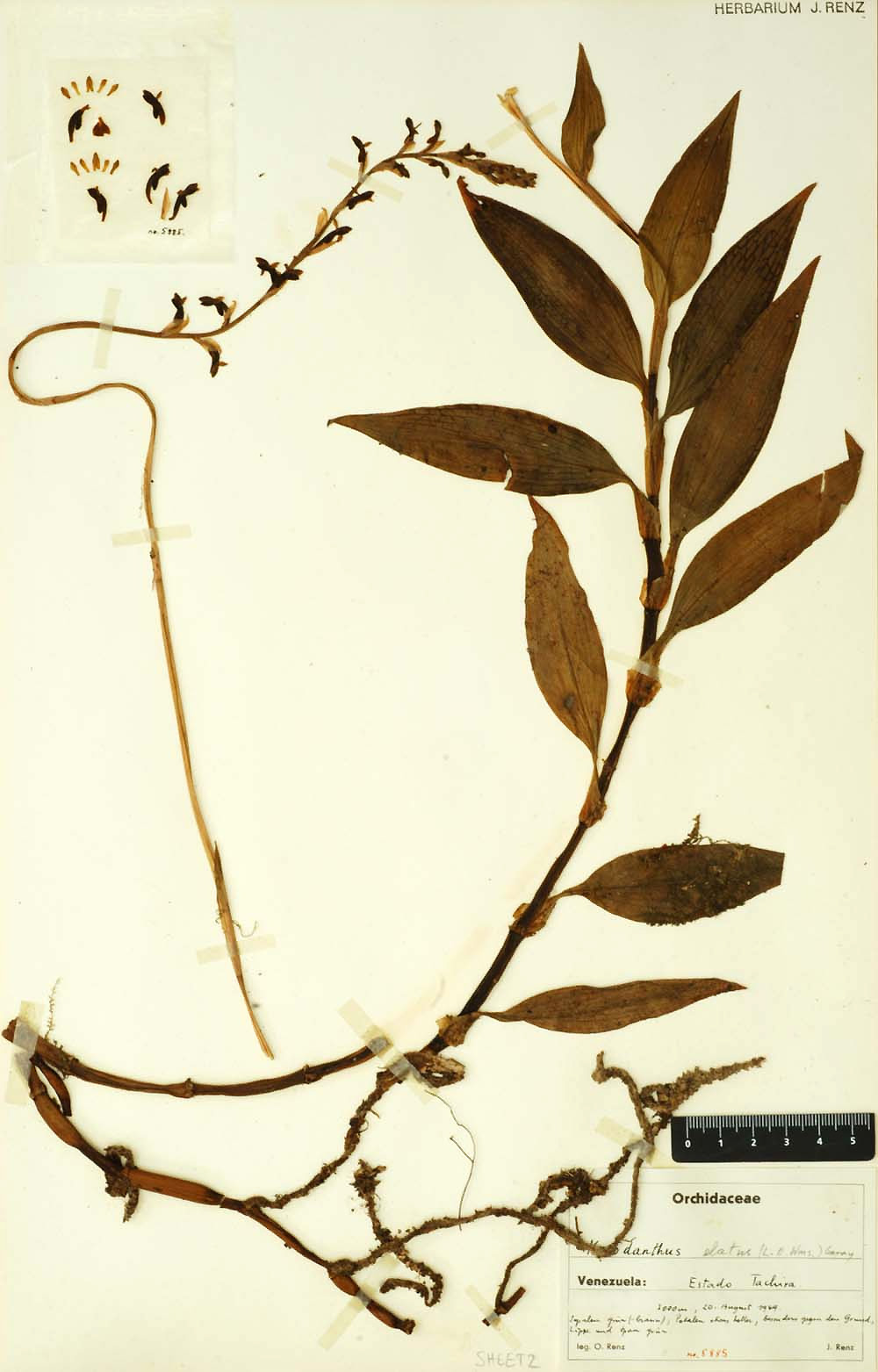
An image of a herbarium specimen, provided by the Swiss Orchid Foundation at the Herbarium Jany Renz (web site)

In botany, a virtual herbarium is a herbarium in a digitized form. That is, it concerns a collection of digital images of preserved plants or plant parts. Virtual herbaria often are established to improve availability of specimens to a wider audience. However, some digital herbaria are not suitable for internet access due to high-resolution scans and large file sizes. Each specimen includes information such as location, collector, and botanical name. Additional details, such as related species and growth requirements, are often mentioned.

== Specimen imaging ==
The standard hardware used for herbarium specimen imaging is the "HerbScan" scanner. It is an inverted flat-bed scanner which raises the specimen up to the scanning surface. This technology was developed because it is standard practice to never turn a herbarium specimen upside-down. Alternatively, some herbaria employ a flat-bed book scanner or a copy stand to achieve the same effect.

A small color chart and a ruler must be included on a herbarium sheet when it is imaged. The JSTOR Plant Science requires that the ruler bears the herbarium name and logo, and that a ColorChecker chart is used for any specimens to be contributed to the Global Plants Initiative (GPI).

== Uses ==
Virtual herbaria are established in part to increase the longevity of specimens. Major herbaria participate in international loan programs, where a researcher can request specimens to be shipped in for study. This shipping contributes to the wear and tear of specimens. If, however, digital images are available, images of the specimens can be sent electronically. These images may be a sufficient substitute for the specimens themselves, or alternatively, the researcher can use the images to "preview" the specimens, to which ones should be sent out for further study. This process cuts down on the shipping, and thus the wear and tear of the specimens, as well as the wait times associated with shipping.

Virtual herbaria can also be used to increase public awareness of herbaria. Some herbaria make their specimen databases publicly available on the Internet. Digital images of specimens can be added to these databases to allow the public to further engage with the material. Some herbaria also capitalize on their images by selling herbarium prints and greeting cards featuring particularly attractive specimens.

== Five task clusters for digitization ==
- pre-digitization curation and staging
- specimen image capture
- specimen image processing
- electronic data capture, and
- georeferencing specimen data

== See also ==
- Herbar Digital
