= Conservation and restoration of herbaria =

Physical care and treatment of preserved plants

The conservation and restoration of herbaria includes the preventive care, repair, and restoration of herbarium specimens. Collections of dried plant specimens are collected from their native habitats, identified by experts, pressed, and mounted onto archival paper. Care is taken to make sure major morphological characteristics are visible. Herbaria documentation provides a record of botanical diversity.

Professionals who make decisions about the conservation-restoration of botanical specimens include registrars, curators, and conservators who work on herbarium collections in universities and museums. Herbarium specimens may be susceptible to water damage, mold, pests, unattached specimens, dust, dirt, and damage from improper storage conditions. Preventive conservation can prevent much of the damage that could occur.

== History ==
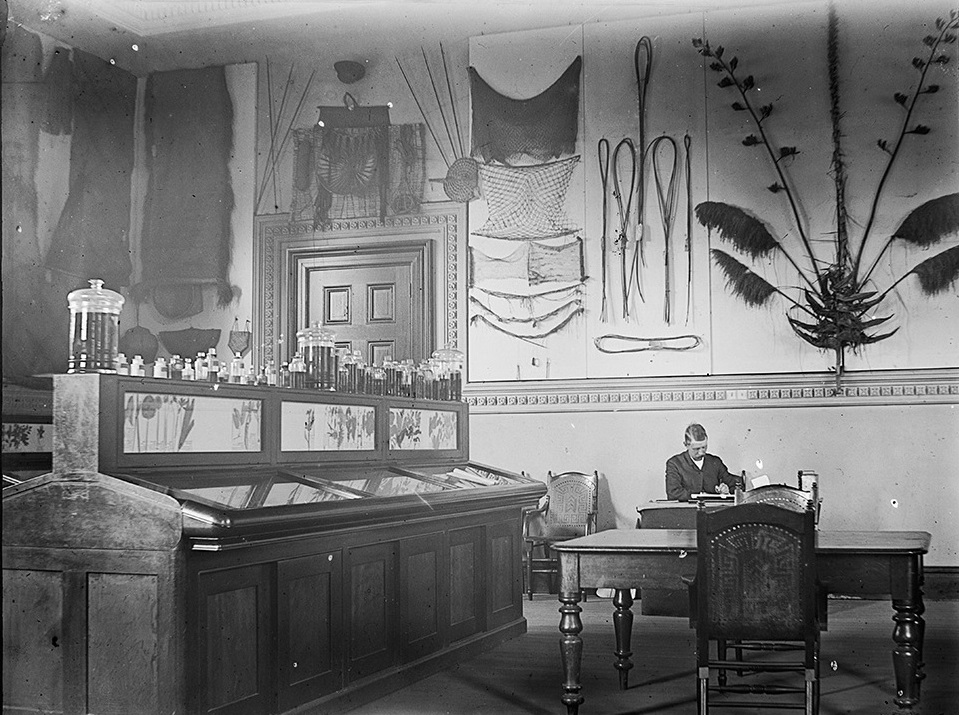
JH Maiden in Herbarium Royal Botanic Gardens, c. 1895

A herbarium is a collection of preserved plant specimens and associated data used for scientific study. Originally, the word "herbarium" referred to books about medicinal plants. In 1700, French botanist Joseph Pitton de Tournefort used the word to describe a collection of dried plants and Carl Linnaeus continued to use this term in his work which is where the term caught on. Initially, herbarium collections were bound in volumes instead of on individual sheets as it is done today. It is not exactly known how long dry plant specimens last in storage, but with proper conservation, they have been able to last many centuries. Specimens collected by Linnaeus in the eighteenth century and by Banks and Solander on the Endeavour voyage in 1788 are still excellently preserved. The specimens may be whole plants or plant parts. These will usually be dried and pressed and mounted on a sheet of paper but, depending upon the material, may also be stored in boxes or kept in alcohol or other preservatives.

=== Types of specimens ===
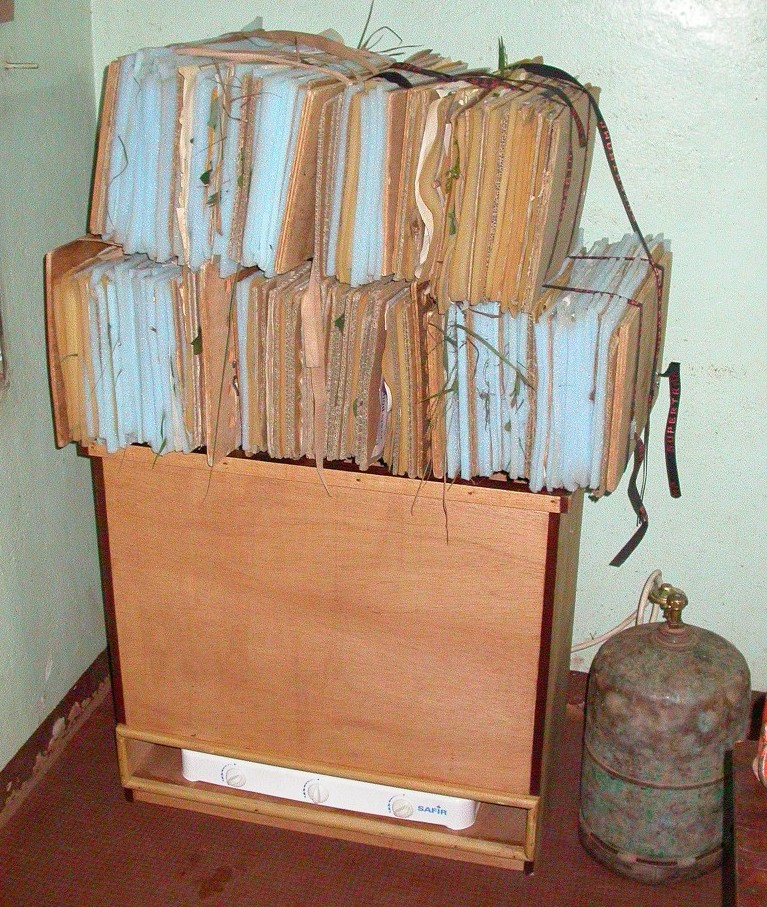
Drying herbarium specimens

- Pressed and dried: Vascular plant (flowering plants, conifers, ferns) specimens are pressed and dried plants that are mounted on herbarium sheets. Various techniques are used to attach the plants with the most common method of using archival adhesive with heavier portions of the plant supported additionally by linen thread or narrow strips of gum-backed linen tape or polyester film. Specimens are best pressed with moderate pressure, permitting as much air circulation as possible. This is commonly achieved by strapping sheets in a press made of heavy cardboard or plywood. If there are loose seeds or fruits, these are placed in a small fragment packet, which also is glued to the sheet. A label with collection information is glued on the bottom right corner.
- Dried: Small bryophytes (mosses, hepatics or liverworts, and hornworts) are dried and placed loosely in folded packets. The label is glued on the front of the packet and the packets are filed loosely in boxes, glued to sheets of mounting paper, or placed loosely in folders.
- Stored in fluid: Preserved material can be kept in a glass jar filled with preservative fluid. By storing this way, the botanical specimens are maintained in a usable condition by inhibiting enzymatic and microbial attack. This method can be used where drying, pressing and mounting on a herbarium sheet is unsuitable. This method allows for a better three-dimensional arrangement of flower parts or fruits for storage.
- Microscope slides: Specimens can be mounted on microscope slides for short-term storage, however, there is a greater risk of rapid deterioration from contracting, darkening, or crystallizing specimens. Slides should be checked on an annual basis to check the condition of preserved specimens.
- Desiccants and freeze-drying: Silica gel or freeze-drying methods can be applied to specimens that require preservation of the shape of a delicate organ such as a flower. Disadvantages of this technique are that the specimen is especially fragile and lacks support. Acid-free tissue is often used for storage.

== Agents of deterioration ==
The practice of preventive conservation is the management of fluctuations in temperature, light, relative humidity, pests, and pollutants that can deteriorate museum collections. These factors are considered agents of deterioration. Understanding the practice of preventive conservation as well as the agents of deterioration is most important when trying to protect, display, and store collections within the conservation field.

=== Physical forces ===
Proper storage in secure and stable shelving will allow for less stress and movement to affect plant collections. Dried and pressed plant specimens can be stored best in archival-grade boxes, or tied in bundles in cardboard folders for long-term storage. For collections that may be handled more frequently, specimens can be placed in archival-grade plastic sheets placed in ring folders.

=== Disaster recovery ===
Water damage resulting from flooding can result in shrinking, distortion, or staining of plant materials. Unforeseen disasters can occur at any time and disaster recovery planning and materials for herbaria are similar to museums and libraries. Little can be done with burnt specimens and fragmented specimens except to preserve and protect what is left intact. The damage most likely to occur is water damage through natural or man-made flooding, such as roof leakage or fire sprinkler malfunction. Damaged or waterlogged specimens are frozen to delay deterioration and prevent a fungal attack, which gives curators time to evaluate the situation and decide how best to approach the problem.

=== Pests ===
Common herbarium pests include: silverfish, book lice (psocids), cigarette or tobacco beetles (Lasioderma), dermestids, drugstore beetles (Stegobium paniceum) A reoccurring threat to the longevity of herbarium specimens is insects, a number of which find dried plants palatable. Historically, various methods have been used to kill insects, which either come in with the plants when they are collected or are in the building where the plants are stored. Pests are commonly treated with two different methods:

- Freezing: Using a clear polyester bag, excess air is pushed out and heat sealed with the specimen inside or the specimen can be placed inside polythene bags and sealed with parcel tape. Then it is placed into a normal domestic freezer for at least 14 days at a temperature of −18 °C (0 °F), or for 72 hours if freezing at −30 °C (−22 °F).
- Anoxia: Small anoxic environments starve the pests of oxygen and are created using sealed barrier films and placing oxygen scavengers and RH buffers inside before sealing.

An integrated pest management program is cost-effective over time and the best preventive measure against pests.

=== Fungal attack ===
The primary risk factor for fungal attack is incomplete drying of specimens, caused either during the specimen preparation process or afterwards, or in collections that become wet later through flood, other water damage or improper storage conditions, especially in the tropics. Properly dried plant specimens will not suffer from fungal attack if stored in the correct conditions. During the drying process specimens are particularly at risk if they dry slowly. This happens through poor drying conditions or specimens being wet before being pressed or having water-retaining or succulent parts. Specimens with sugary exudations or large quantities of nectar are also particularly attractive to fungi and need special care during drying to ensure that they dry fast enough to prevent mold growth. If fungal growth occurs on specimens, it can be brushed with 95% ethanol or methylated spirits (denatured alcohol). However, this may alter the specimen for chemical and other investigative research and only kills the fungus present on the specimen, not preventing further problems of fungal growth.

=== Light ===
Herbarium specimens are sensitive to visible light and ultraviolet radiation, which can cause fading of biological pigments (fading or shifts in color) and/or damage to chemical bonds (weakened or embrittled).

=== Theft ===
To best establish protocols for specimen movement control, a system of documentation can be set up to monitor and control collections. At the National Museum of Natural History, theft is prevented by maintaining limited access to where collections are stored. In the event of a specimen leaving the site through outgoing loans, records are kept which gather letters of request, the transmission of names, and other supporting documentation.

=== Pollutants ===
Storage in metal cabinets is the best material to maintain herbaria collections. Metal cabinets do not release volatile organic compounds as wooden cabinets do. The metal shelves can be easily cleaned and a well-sealed cabinet will provide a stable microclimate for the specimen.

=== Disassociation ===
Ensuring that every specimen has an individual accession number will reduce the risk of disassociation. The accession number relates that number to an identifiable object and the object can only be moved if its location is updated, ensuring the object is never disassociated from its data. Most herbaria utilize a standard system of organizing their specimens into herbarium cases. Specimen sheets are stacked in groups by the species to which they belong and placed into a large lightweight folder that is labeled on the bottom edge. Groups of species folders are then placed together into larger folders by genus. The genus folders are then sorted by taxonomic family according to the standard system selected for use by the herbarium and placed into pigeonholes in herbarium cabinets. Locating a specimen filed in the herbarium requires knowing the nomenclature and classification used by the herbarium. It also requires familiarity with possible name changes that have occurred since the specimen was collected, since the specimen may be filed under an older name. Modern herbaria often maintain electronic databases of their collections. Many herbaria have initiatives to digitize specimens to produce a virtual herbarium. These records and images are made publicly accessible via the Internet when possible.

== Repair and restoration ==
Pressed and dried specimen with linen tape supports

Before beginning the process of restoration of a herbarium sheet, best practices suggest that the original mounted specimen be photographed for reference to ensure a new sheet is as close to the original as possible. The original mounting sheet can be dried and flattened in the same manner as the plant to serve as a reference for positioning the specimen on a new sheet. Additionally, any labels or supplement information accompanying the plant should be placed in the same place.

=== Cleaning ===
Dust and dirt are removed from herbarium sheets by using a smoke sponge. Conservators gently rub the place where the dirt is and then softly remove any excess with a fine brush. Care must be taken by conservators when dealing with older prepared specimens that may have traces of toxic chemicals. Making use of personal protective equipment by professionals can reduce the risk of exposure or harm due to dangerous materials.

=== Broken specimens ===
Broken specimens are reattached to the herbaria sheet using thinly cut strips of archival pre-gummed linen tape. Detached materials such as seeds or leaves are placed in an acid-free card fragment packet, which is secured onto the sheet with the original specimen.

=== Removal from mounting sheet ===
Unattached specimens are removed from the herbaria sheet by humidifying it to make them pliable and removing the plant with a paper lifter (smooth wooden spatula). They are then placed to dry and flatten along with the original mounting sheet and written documentation (label and annotations). The specimen and original documents are then remounted to a new sheet using the original sheet as reference.
