= Peugeot =

French automotive brand founded in 1810

Automobiles Peugeot
- Type: Subsidiary
- Industry: Automotive
- Founded: 26 September 1810; 216 years ago
- Founder: Armand Peugeot (who incorporated the automotive company in 1896)
- Fate: Merged with Citroën in 1976 to form the PSA Group
- Headquarters: Legal and top level administrative: Poissy (new); Ave. de la Grande Armée, Paris (old); Operational: Sochaux, France
- Area served: Worldwide (except the U.S., Canada and North Korea)
- Key people: Alain Favey (CEO)
- Products: Automobiles; Commercial vehicles
- Production output: ▲2,119,845 (2017)
- Parent: Stellantis
- Divisions: Peugeot Sport; Peugeot Motocycles; Cycles Peugeot (formerly)
- Website: peugeot.com

Peugeot (UK: /ˈpɜːʒoʊ/, US: /p(j)uːˈʒoʊ/; French: [pøʒo]) is a French automobile brand owned by Stellantis.

Peugeot was founded as a family business in 1810 and Automobiles Peugeot was created in 1896, making it the oldest car company in the world. On 20 November 1858, Émile Peugeot applied for the lion trademark. Armand Peugeot (1849–1915) built the company's first vehicle, a steam-powered tricycle. In 1886, the company collaborated with Léon Serpollet, followed by the development of an internal combustion car in 1890, which used a Panhard-Daimler engine.

The Peugeot family and company are originally from Sochaux, where Peugeot still operates a large manufacturing facility and the Peugeot Museum.

Peugeot vehicles have received numerous international accolades, including six European Car of the Year awards. The brand also boasts over a century of success in motorsport, with victories including the Indianapolis 500 in 1913, 1916, and 1919. Peugeot Sport has won the World Rally Championship five times (1985, 1986, 2000, 2001, 2002), the Dakar Rally seven times (1987, 1988, 1989, 1990, 2016, 2017, 2018), the 24 Hours of Le Mans three times (1992, 1993, 2009), the World Endurance Championship twice (1992, 1993), the Intercontinental Rally Challenge Championship three times, the Intercontinental Le Mans Cup twice (2010, 2011), and the Pikes Peak International Hill Climb three times (1988, 1989, 2013).

== History ==
=== Early manufacturing ===
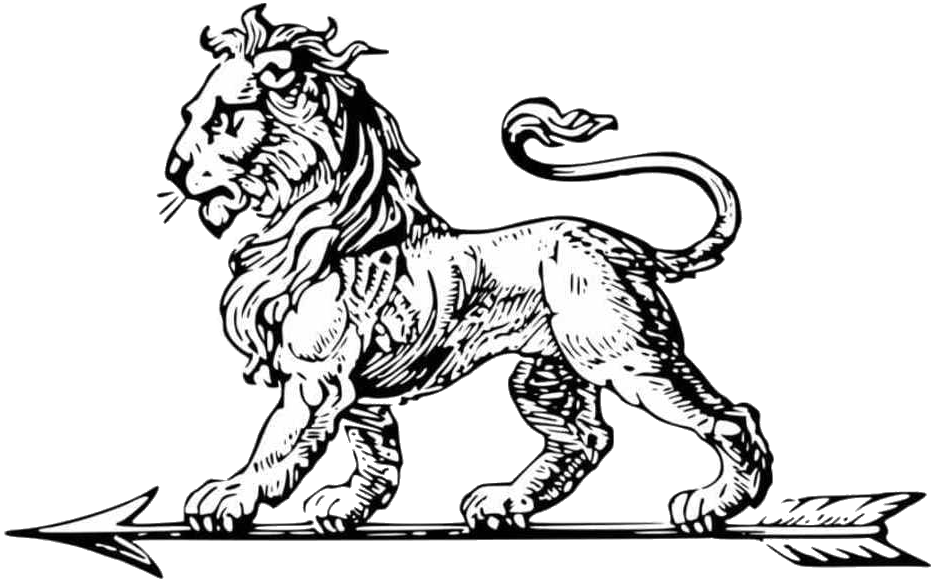
Peugeot's first emblem, displaying the lion figure, 1810

The Peugeot family of Valentigney, Montbéliard, Franche-Comté, France, began in the manufacturing business in 1810 with a steel foundry, which quickly started manufacturing saws; then other hand tools and, circa 1840 to 1842, coffee grinders; in the 1850s, the company introduced waist corsets made with light steel blades; then, in 1874, pepper grinders; and then, circa 1880, bicycles. The company's entry into the vehicle market was by means of stiff, structured petticoats or crinoline dresses, which used steel rods, leading to umbrella frames, chisels, wire wheels, and bicycles. Armand Peugeot introduced his "Le Grand Bi" penny-farthing in 1882, along with a range of other bicycles.

The company's logo, initially a lion walking on an arrow, symbolized the speed, strength, and flexibility of the Peugeot saw blades. The car and motorcycle company and the bicycle company parted ways in 1926, but the family-owned Cycles Peugeot continued to build bicycles throughout the 20th century until the brand name was sold off to unrelated firms. The family-owned firm Peugeot Saveurs continues to make and market grinders and other kitchen and table-service equipment.

=== Early motor vehicles ===
Armand Peugeot became interested in the automobile early on and, after meeting with Gottlieb Daimler and others were convinced of its viability. The first Peugeot automobile, a three-wheeled, steam-powered car designed by Léon Serpollet, was produced in 1889; only four examples were made. Steam power was heavy and bulky and required lengthy warm-up times. In 1890, after meeting Daimler and Émile Levassor, steam was abandoned in favour of a four-wheeled car with a petrol-fuelled internal combustion engine built by Panhard under Daimler licence. The car was more sophisticated than many of its contemporaries, with a three-point suspension and a sliding-gear transmission. An example was sold to the young Alberto Santos-Dumont, who exported it to Brazil.

More cars followed, 29 being built in 1892, 40 in 1894, 72 in 1895, 156 in 1898, and 300 in 1899. These early models were given "type" numbers. Peugeot became the first manufacturer to fit rubber tyres (solid, rather than pneumatic) to a petrol-powered car. Due to family discord, Armand Peugeot founded the Société des Automobiles Peugeot, in 1896, but in 1910 it was merged back with the family's Peugeot bicycle and motorcycle business.

Peugeot was an early pioneer in motor racing, with Albert Lemaître winning the world's first motor race, the Paris–Rouen, in a 3 hp Peugeot. Five Peugeots qualified for the main event, and all finished. Lemaître finished 3 min 30 sec behind the Comte de Dion whose steam-powered car was ineligible for the official competition. Three Peugeots were entered in the Paris–Bordeaux–Paris, where they were beaten by Panhard's car (despite an average speed of 20.8 km/h (12.9 mph) and taking the 31,500 franc prize). This also marked the debut of Michelin pneumatic tyres in racing, also on a Peugeot; they proved insufficiently durable. Nevertheless, the vehicles were still very much horseless carriages in appearance and were steered by a tiller.

In 1896, the first Peugeot engines were built; no longer were they reliant on Daimler. Designed by Rigoulot, the first engine was an 8 hp (6.0 kW) horizontal twin fitted to the back of the Type 15. It also served as the basis of a nearly exact copy produced by Rochet-Schneider. Further improvements followed: the engine moved to the front on the Type 48 and was soon under a bonnet at the front of the car, instead of hidden underneath; the steering wheel was adopted on the Type 36, and they began to look more like the modern car.

Also in 1896, Armand Peugeot broke away from Les Fils de Peugeot Frères to form his own company, Société Anonyme des Automobiles Peugeot, building a new factory at Audincourt to focus entirely on cars. In 1899, sales hit 300; total car sales for all of France that year were 1,200. The same year, Lemaître won the Nice-Castellane-Nice Rally in a special 5,850 cc (357 cu in) 20 hp (14.9 kW) racer.

At the 1901 Paris Salon, Peugeot debuted a tiny shaft-driven 652 cc (40 cu in) 5 hp (3.7 kW) one-cylinder, dubbed "Bébé" ("baby"), and shed its conservative image, becoming a style leader. After placing 19th in the 1902 Paris-Vienna Rally with a 50 hp (37.3 kW) 11,322 cc (691 cu in) racer, and failing to finish with two similar cars, Peugeot quit racing.

In 1898, Peugeot Motocycles presents at the Paris Motorshow the first motorcycle equipped with a Dion-Bouton motor. Peugeot Motocycles remains the oldest motorcycle manufacturer in the world.

Peugeot added motorcycles to its range in 1901, and they have been built under the Peugeot name ever since. By 1903, Peugeot produced half of the cars built in France, and they offered the 5 hp (4 kW) Bébé, a 6.5 hp (4.8 kW) four-seater, and an 8 hp (6.0 kW) and 12 hp (8.9 kW) resembling contemporary Mercedes models.

The 1907 salon showed Peugeot's first six-cylinder and marked Tony Huber joining as an engine builder. By 1910, Peugeot's product line included a 1,149 cc (70 cu in) two-cylinder and six four-cylinders, of between two and six liters. In addition, a new factory opened the same year at Sochaux, which became the main plant in 1928.

A more famous name, Ettore Bugatti, designed the new 850 cc (52 cu in) four-cylinder Bébé of 1912. The same year, Peugeot returned to racing with a team of three driver-engineers (a breed typical of the pioneer period, exemplified by Enzo Ferrari among others): Jules Goux (graduate of Arts et Metiers, Paris), Paolo Zuccarelli (formerly of Hispano-Suiza), and Georges Boillot (collectively called Les Charlatans), with 26-year-old Swiss engineer Ernest Henry to make their ideas reality. The company decided voiturette (light car) racing was not enough, and chose to try grandes épreuves (grand touring). They did so with an engineering tour de force: a dual overhead camshaft (DOHC) 7.6-liter four-cylinder (110x200 mm) with four valves per cylinder. It proved faster than other cars of its time, and Boillot won the 1912 French Grand Prix at an average of 68.45 mph (110.2 km/h), despite losing third gear and taking a 20-minute pit stop. In May 1913, Goux took one to Indianapolis, and won at an average of 75.92 mph (122.2 km/h), recording straightaway speeds of 93.5 mph (150.5 km/h). making Peugeot the first non-American-based auto company to win at the Indianapolis Motor Speedway. In 1914, Boillot's 3-liter L5 set a new Indy lap record of 99.5 mph (160.1 km/h), and Duray placed second (beaten by ex-Peugeot ace René Thomas in a 6,235 cc (380 cu in) Delage). Another (driven by Boillot's brother, André) placed in 1915; similar models won in 1916 (Dario Resta) and 1919 (Howdy Wilcox).

For the 1913 French Grand Prix, an improved L5 (with 5,655 cc (345 cu in) engine) was produced with a pioneering ballbearing crankshaft, gear-driven camshafts, and dry sump lubrication, all of which soon became standard on racing cars; Zuccarelli was killed during testing on public roads, but Boillot easily won the event, making him (and Peugeot) the race's first double winner. For the 1914 French GP, Peugeot was overmatched by Mercedes, and despite a new innovation, four-wheel brakes (against the Mercedes' rear-only), Georges proved unable to match them and the car broke down. (Surprisingly, a 1914 model turned a 103 mph (165.8 km/h) lap in practice at Indy in 1949, yet it failed to qualify.) Peugeot was more fortunate in 1915, winning at the French GP and Vanderbilt Cup.

During the First World War, Peugeot turned largely to arms production, becoming a major manufacturer of arms and military vehicles, from armoured cars and bicycles to shells. Between 1917 and 1920 the company produced 4,084 Type 1525 trucks. Peugeot also manufactured aircraft engines. The firm designed and built the Peugeot 8Aa engines, which equipped the 1,123 Voisin VIII bombers and cannon fighters used by the Aéronautique Militaire. Additionally, Peugeot was one of the major license producers of the Hispano-Suiza 8 aero engines which powered many French and British fighter aircraft during the second half of the conflict.

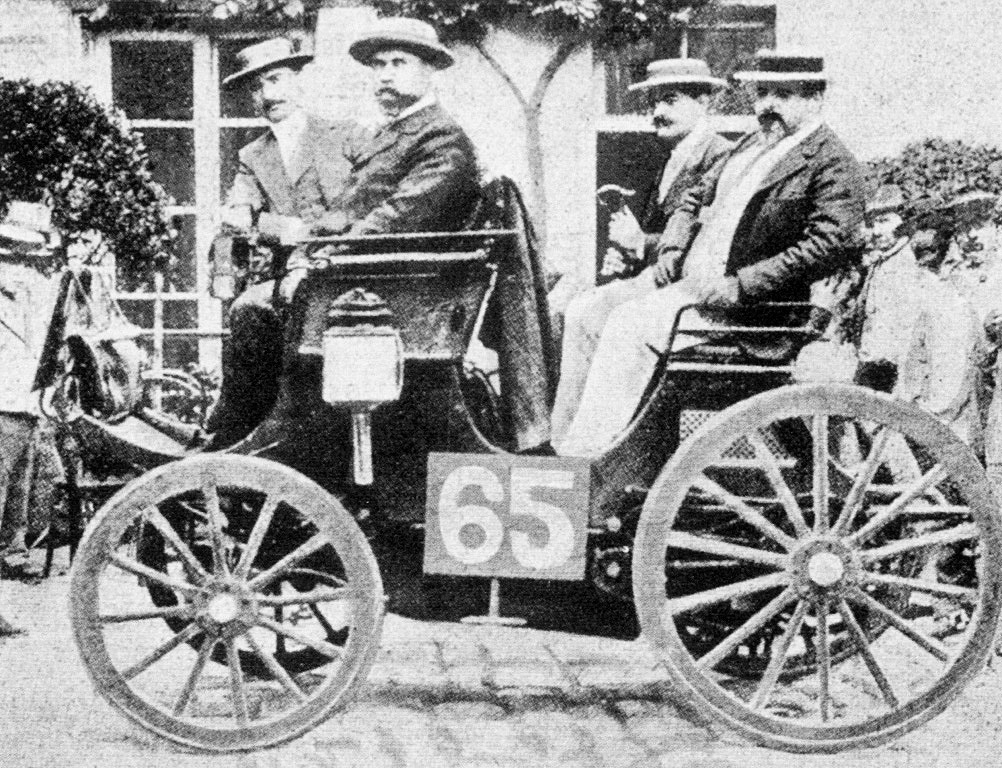
Paris-Rouen 1894. Albert Lemaître (pictured on left) was classified first in his Peugeot 3 hp. Bicycle manufacturer Adolphe Clément-Bayard was the front passenger.

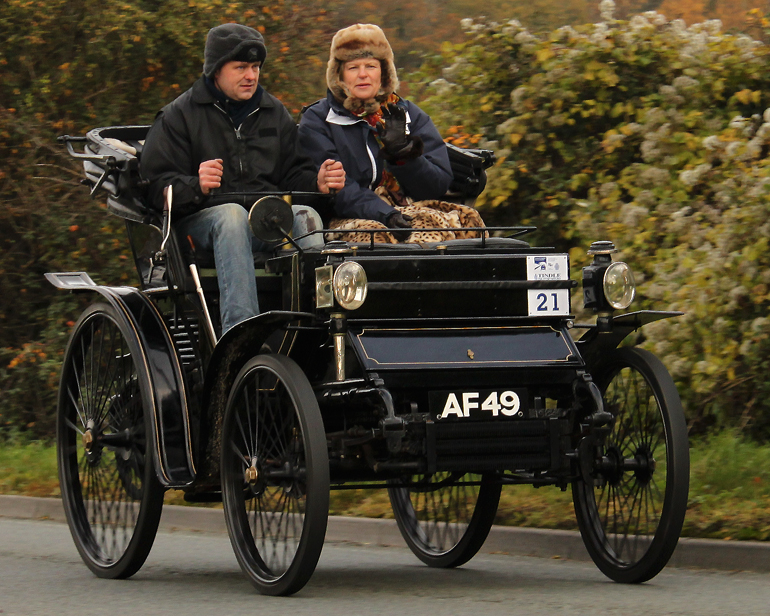
Peugeot 6HP Vis-à-vis 1898

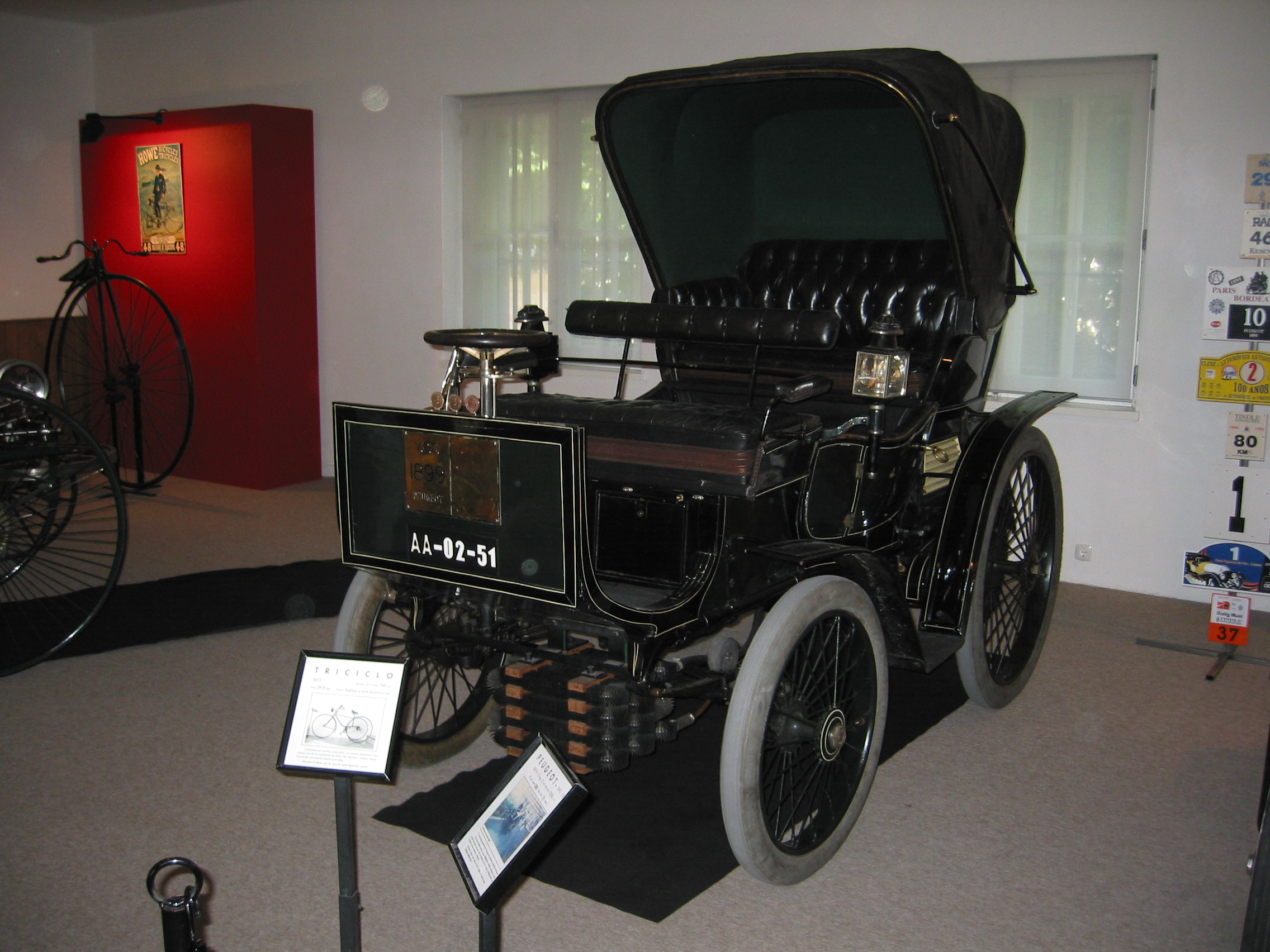
Peugeot Type 19, 1899

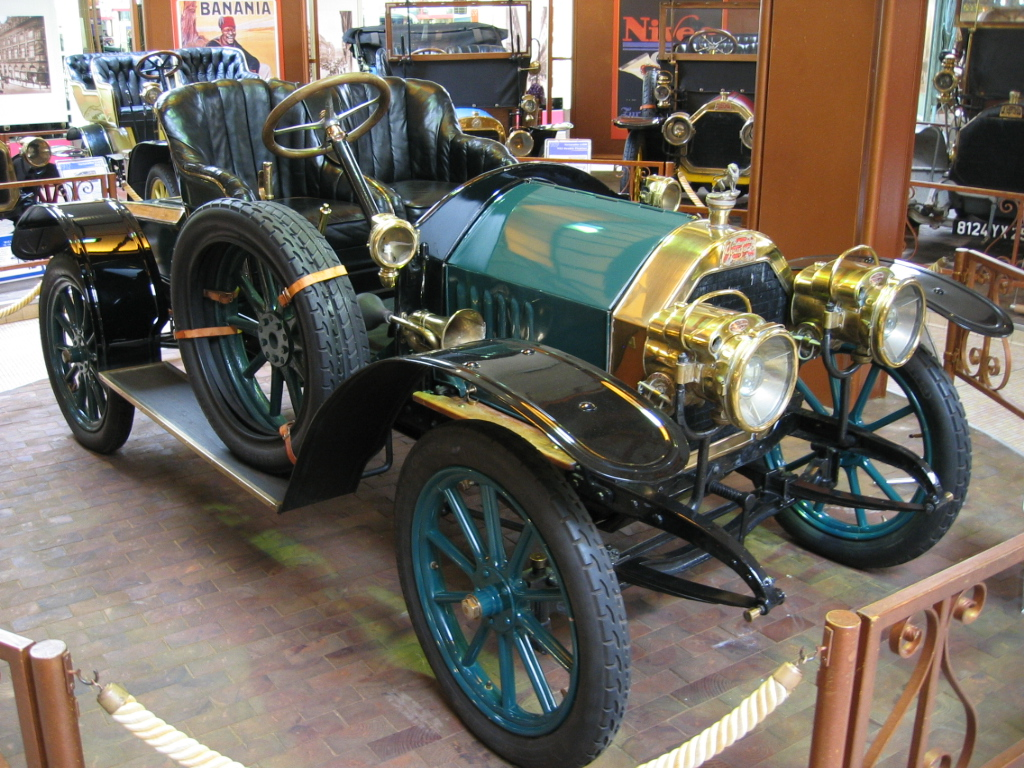
Peugeot Type 125, a midrange car produced in 1910

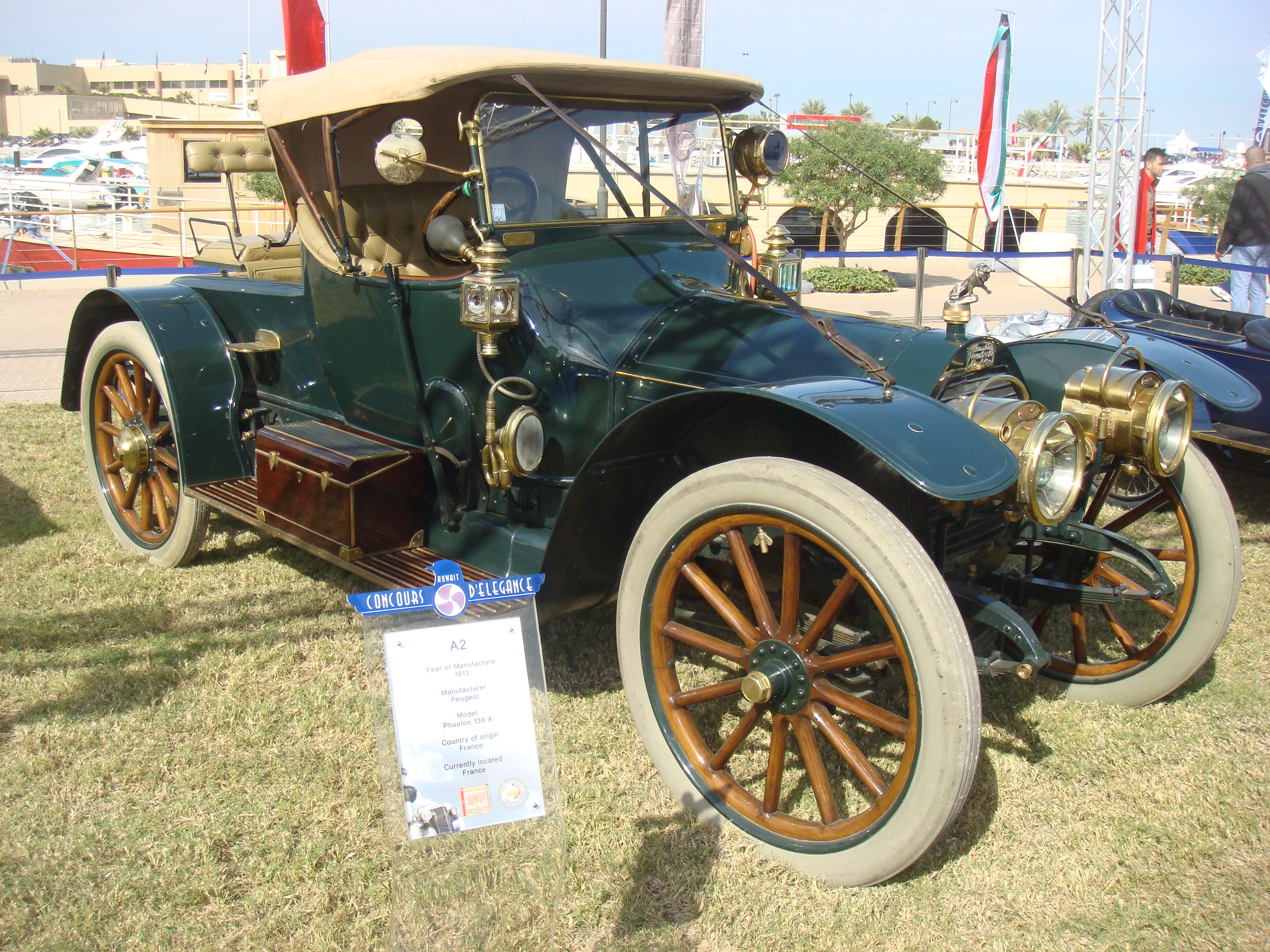
Peugeot, model Phaeton 139A, 1913

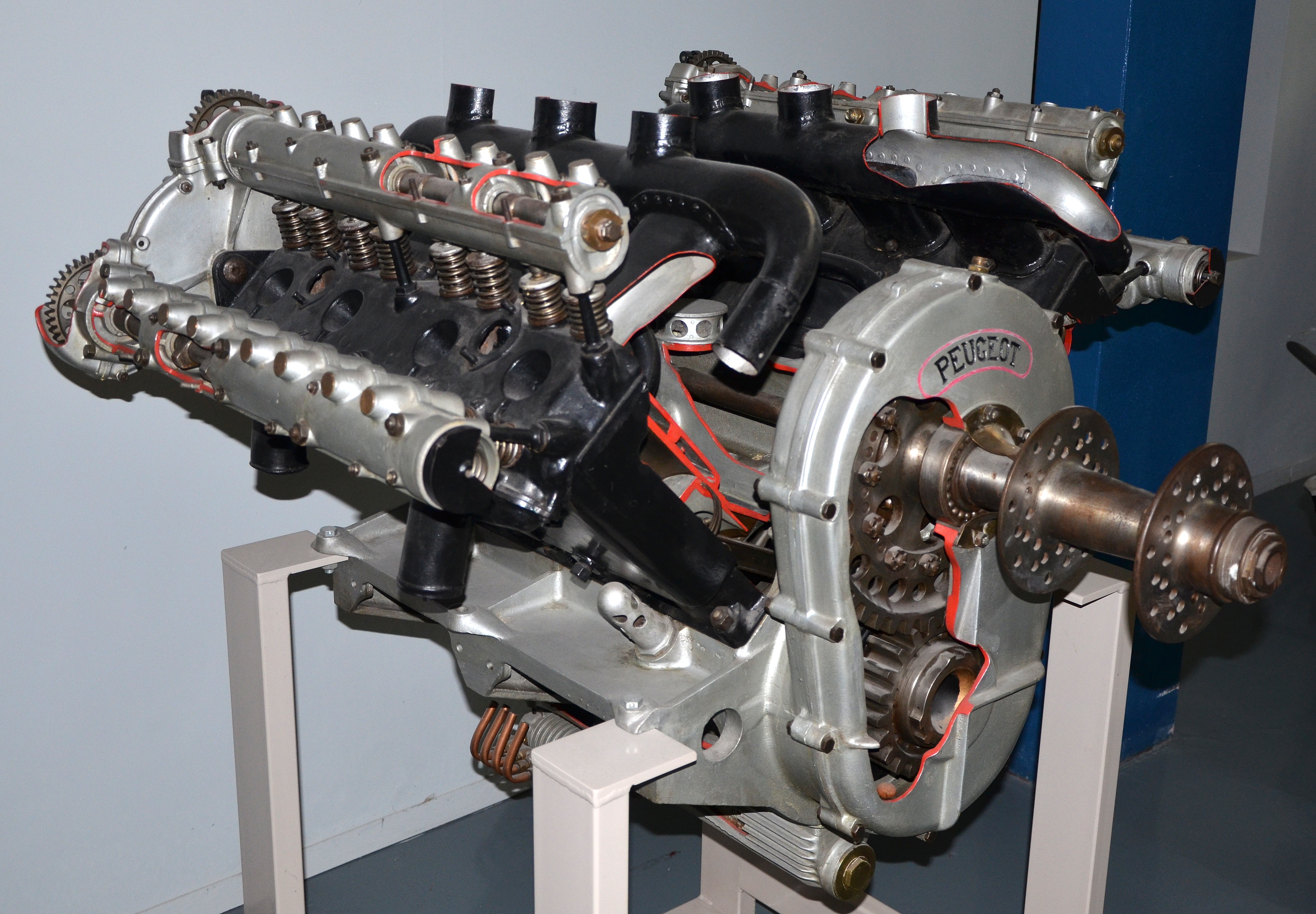
Peugeot 8Aa, aircraft engine, 1916

=== Interwar years ===
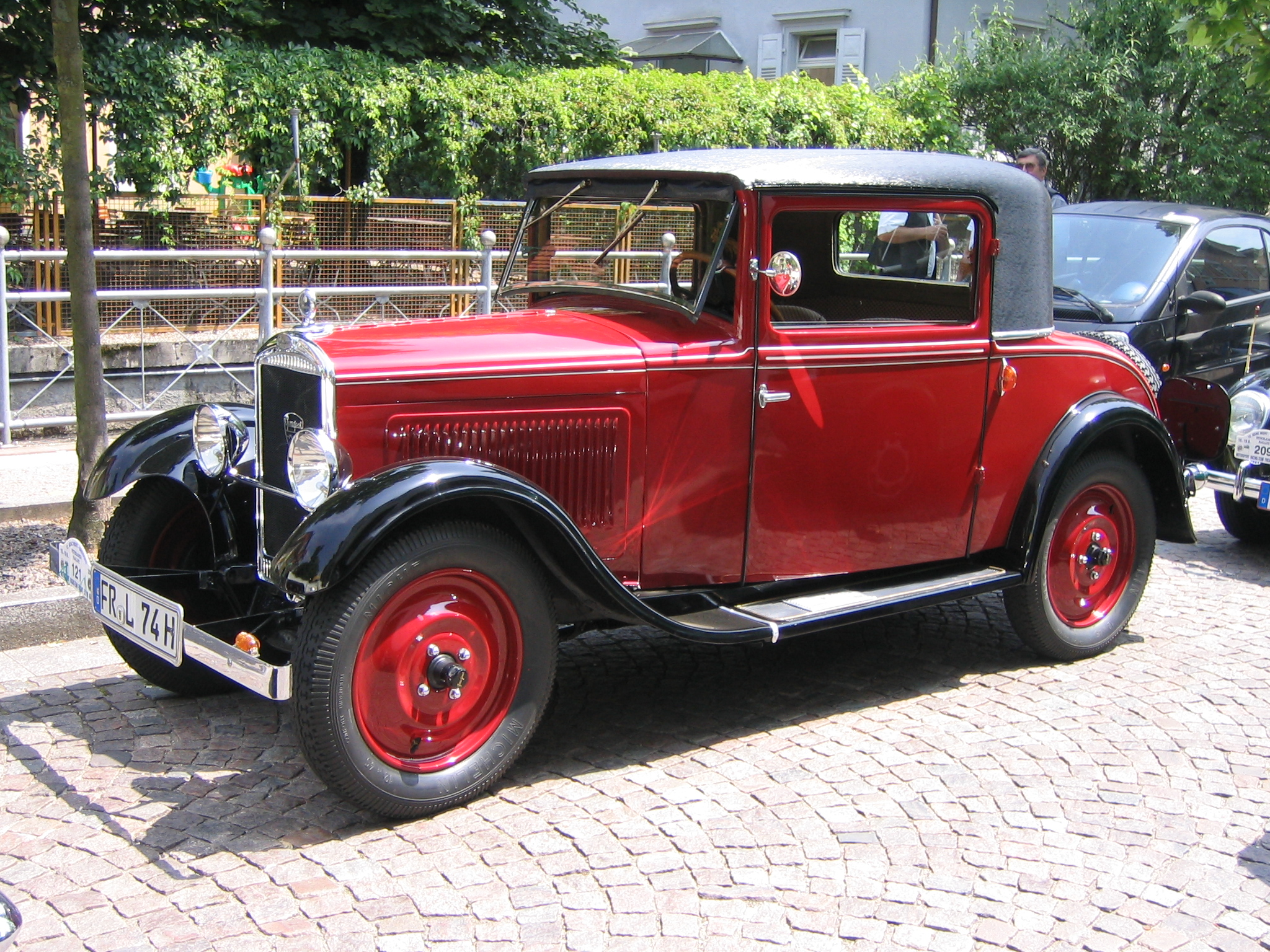
Peugeot 201

After the war, car production resumed in earnest. Racing continued as well, with Boillot entering the 1919 Targa Florio in a 2.5-liter (150-in^{3}) car designed for an event pre-empted by World War I; the car had 200,000 km (120,000 mi) on it, yet Boillot won with an impressive drive (the best of his career) Peugeots in his hands were third in the 1925 Targa, first in the 1922 and 1925 Coppa Florios, first in the 1923 and 1925 Touring Car Grands Prix, and first at the 1926 Spa 24 Hours. Peugeot introduced a five-valve-per-cylinder, triple-overhead-cam engine for the Grand Prix, conceived by Marcel Gremillon (who had criticised the early DOHC), but the engine was a failure.

The same year, Peugeot debuted 10 hp (7.5 kW) and 14 hp (10.4 kW) fours, the larger based on the Type 153, and a 6-liter 25 hp (19 kW) sleeve valve six, as well as a new cyclecar, La Quadrilette.

During the 1920s, Peugeot expanded, in 1926 splitting the cycle (pedal and motor) business off to form Cycles Peugeot, the consistently profitable cycle division seeking to free itself from the rather more cyclical auto business, and taking over the defunct Bellanger and De Dion companies in 1927. In 1928, the Type 183 was introduced.

Peugeot Sochaux production (units):

- 1930 43,303
- 1931 33,322
- 1932 28,317

Soon after the timely introduction of the Peugeot 201, the Great Depression hit all the French auto-makers: Peugeot sales slumped, but the company survived.

New for 1929 was the Peugeot 201, the cheapest car on the French market, and the first to use the later Peugeot trademark (and registered as such)—three digits with a central zero. The 201 would get independent front suspension in 1931, Soon afterwards, the Depression hit; Peugeot sales decreased, but the company survived. The Peugeot system of using three-digit names with a central 0 was introduced in 1929. The first digit has always signified the car's size and the final digit has indicated the generation of the vehicle.

In 1933, attempting a revival of fortune, the company unveiled a new, aerodynamically styled range. In 1934, Peugeot introduced the 402 BL Éclipse Décapotable, the first convertible with a retractable hardtop — an idea followed later by the Ford Skyliner in the 1950s and revived in the modern era by the Mitsubishi 3000GT Spyder in 1995. More recently, many manufacturers have offered retractable hardtops, including Peugeot itself with the 206-cc.

Three models of the 1930s were the Peugeot 202, Peugeot 302, and Peugeot 402. These cars had curvaceous designs, with headlights behind sloping grille bars, evidently inspired by the Chrysler Airflow. The 2.1-liter 402 entered production in 1935 and was produced until the end of 1941, despite France's occupation by the Nazis. For 1936, the new Airflow-inspired 302 (which ran until 1938) and a 402-based large model, designed by Andrean, featured a vertical fin and bumper, with the first high-mounted taillight. The entry-level 202 was built in series from 1938 to 1942, and about 20 more examples were built from existing stocks of supplies in February 1945. The 202 lifted Peugeot's sales in 1939 to 52,796, just behind Citroën. Regular production began again in mid-1946, and lasted into 1949.

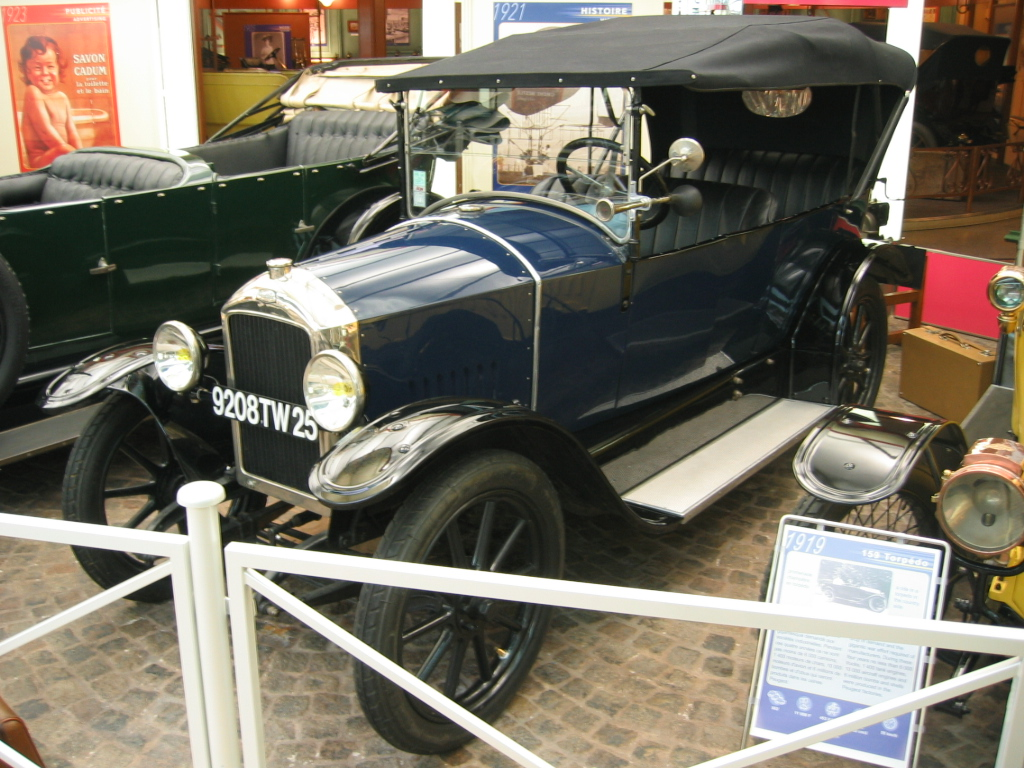
Peugeot Type 163, produced from 1919 to 1924

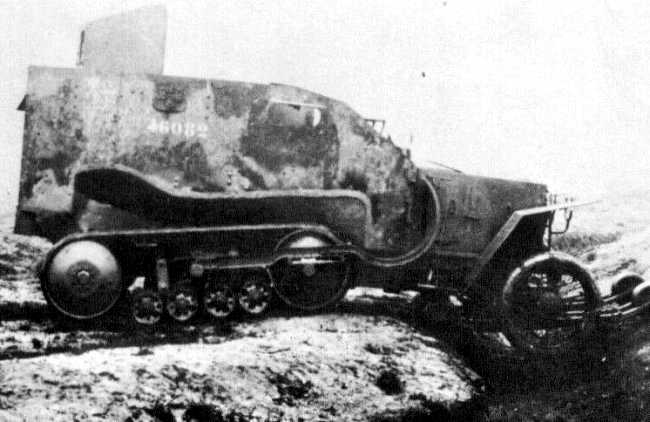
Experimental Peugeot-Kégresse track armoured car being tested in 1923

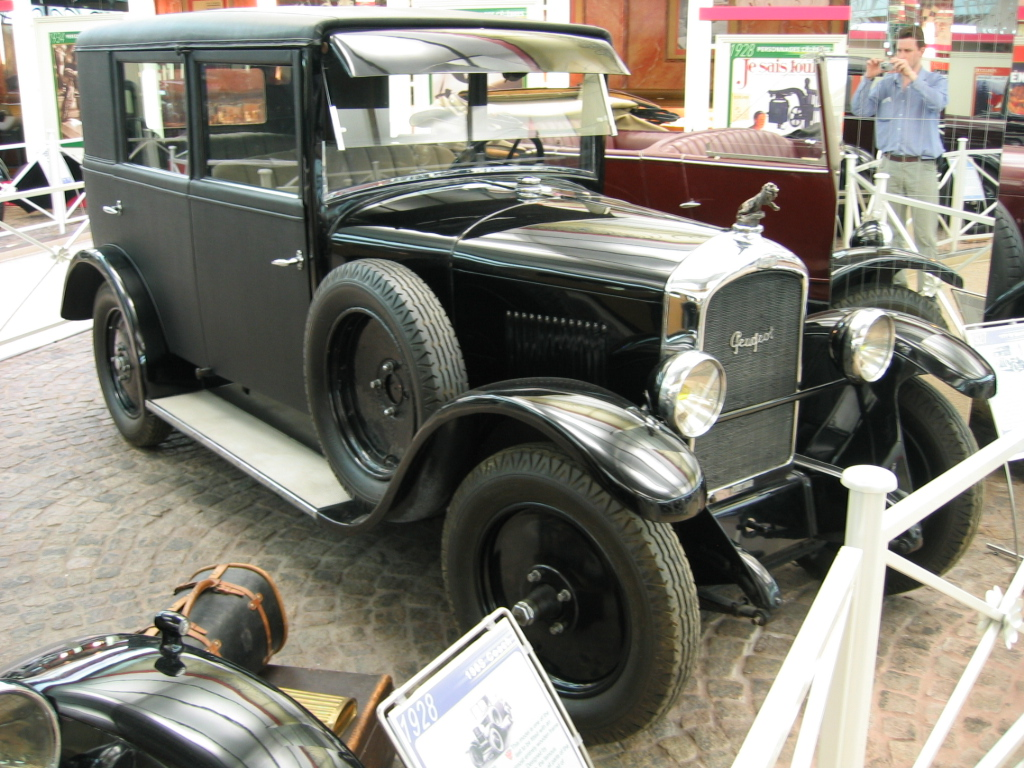
Peugeot Type 177, produced from 1924 to 1929

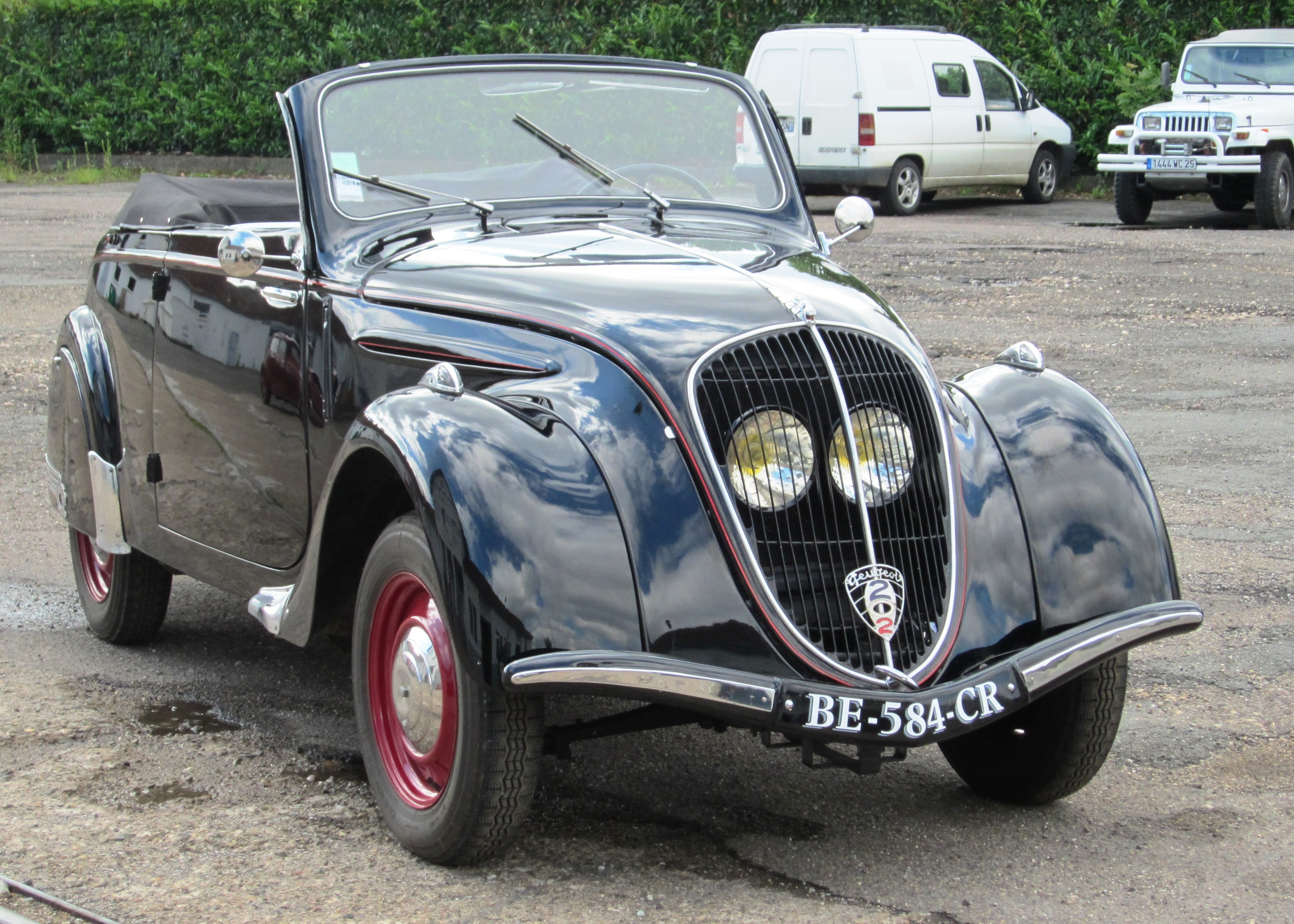
Peugeot 202 cabriolet. The protected position of the headlights behind the grill became a key identifier for the Peugeot brand during the 1930s.

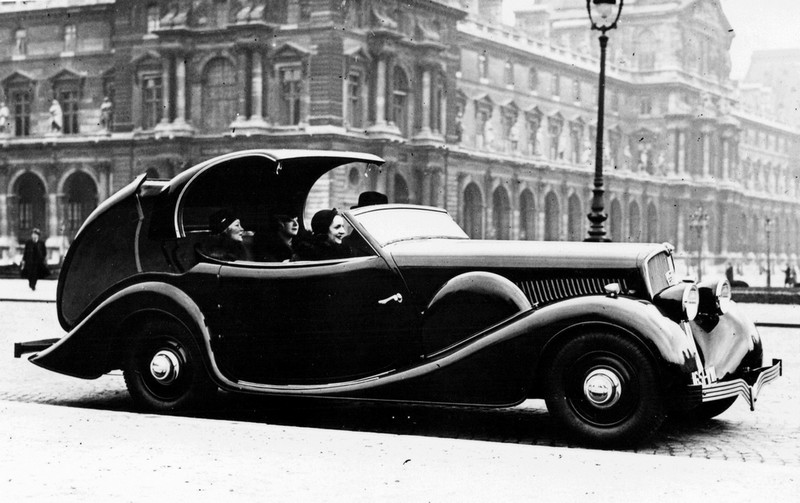
Peugeot 601 C Eclipse 1934 Pourtout

=== During World War II ===
Peugeot assisted the Nazi German war effort by manufacturing armored vehicles.

While Peugeot manufactured vehicles for the Nazi war effort, management was generally more sympathetic with the French Resistance, with workers engaging in industrial sabotage and Rudolphe and Jean-Pierre Peugeot themselves granting a loan of one hundred thousand francs to Special Operations Executive agent Harry Rée. In 1943, after a July bombing raid that left 110 dead, Peugeot management at the Sochaux plant also made a deal with Rée to continue sabotage operations in order to avoid being subjected to future bombing operations by the Royal Air Force. This sabotage operation involved a team of 22 saboteurs who were never identified by the Waffen-SS tasked with security of the plant.

During World War II, Peugeot produced VLV, a two-seater electric car, in response to fuel shortages. The company built 377 examples, many of which were used by the postal service.

=== After World War II ===
In 1946, the company restarted car production with the 202, delivering 14,000 copies. In 1947, Peugeot introduced the Peugeot 203, with coil springs, rack-and-pinion steering, and hydraulic brakes. The 203 set new Peugeot sales records, remaining in production until 1960.

Peugeot took over Chenard-Walcker in 1950, having already been required to acquire a controlling interest in Automobiles Hotchkiss in 1942. A popular model introduced in 1955 was the Peugeot 403. With a 1.5-liter engine, it sold one million copies by the end of its production run in 1962.

The company began selling cars in the United States in 1958, and in 1960 introduced the Peugeot 404, which used a 1,618 cc (99 cu in) engine, tilted 45 degrees. The 404 proved rugged enough to win the East African Safari Rally four times, in 1963, 1966, 1967, and 1968.

More models followed, many styled by Pininfarina, such as the 504, one of Peugeot's most distinctive models. Like many European manufacturers, collaboration with other firms increased; Peugeot worked with Renault from 1966 and Volvo from 1972. The results of this cooperation included the development of the V6 PRV engine, which was first manufactured in 1974.

Several Peugeot models were assembled in Australia, commencing with the 203 in 1953. These were followed by 403, 404 and 504 models with Australian assembly ending with the 505 in the early 1980s.

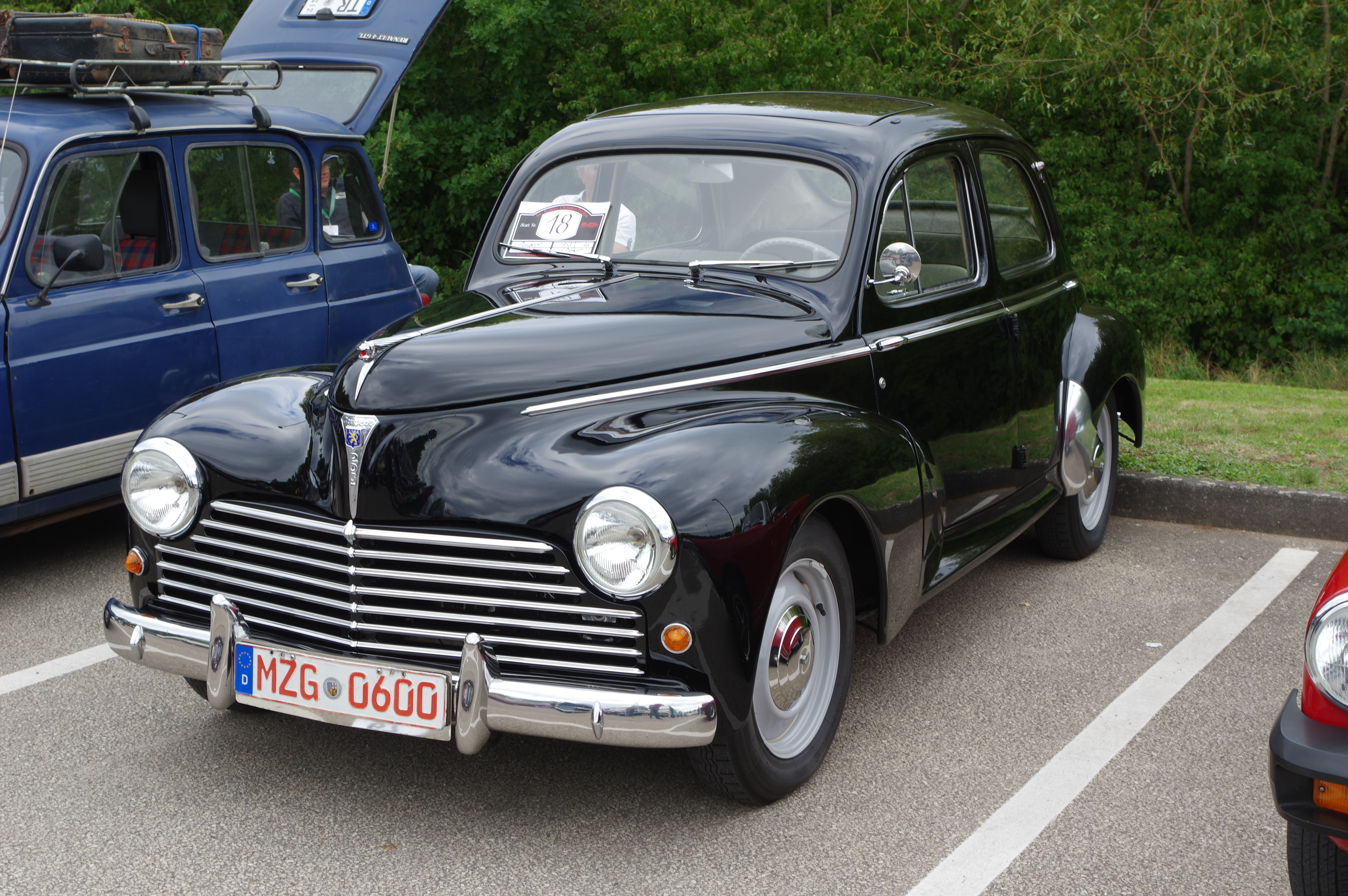
Peugeot 203

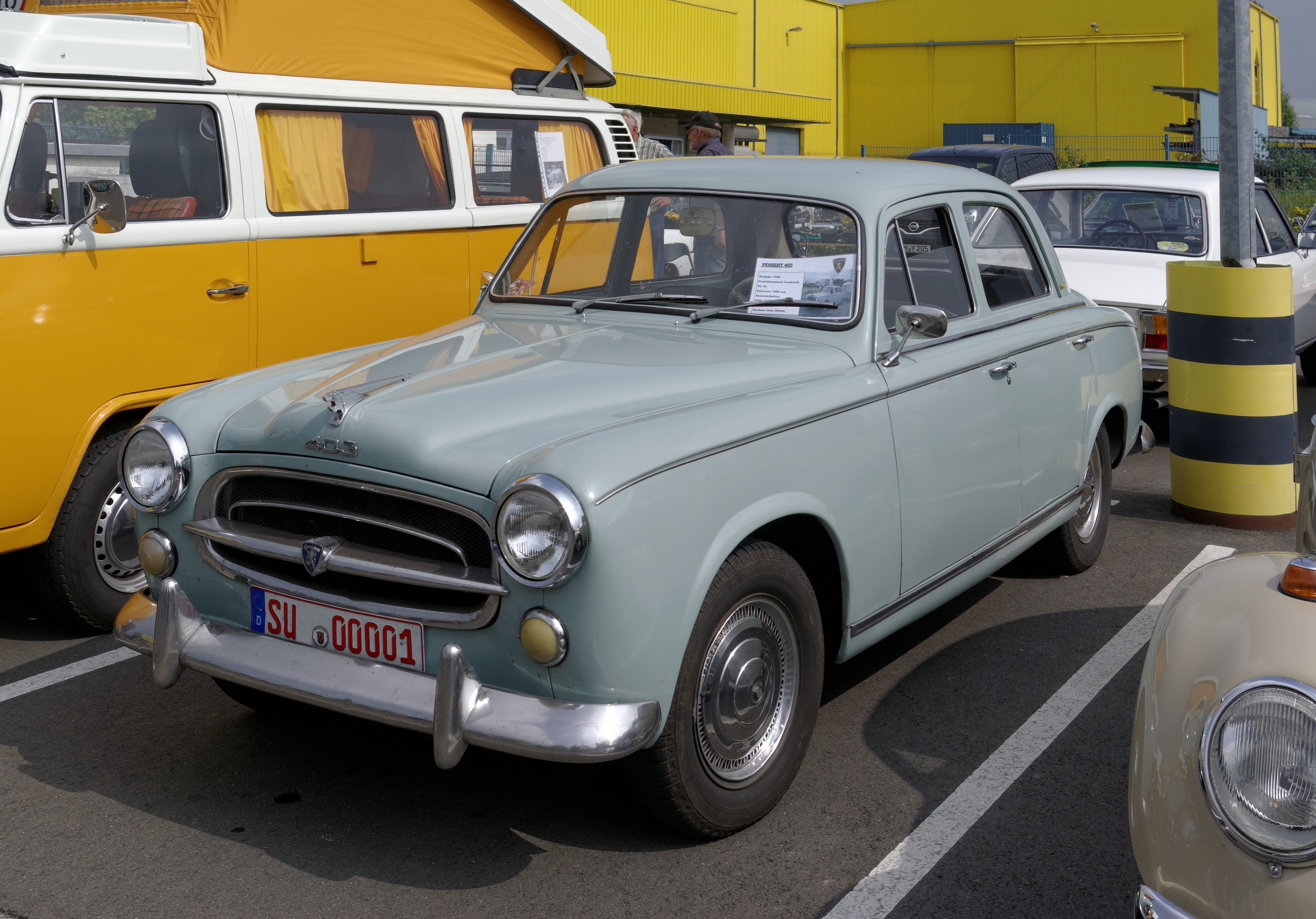
Peugeot 403

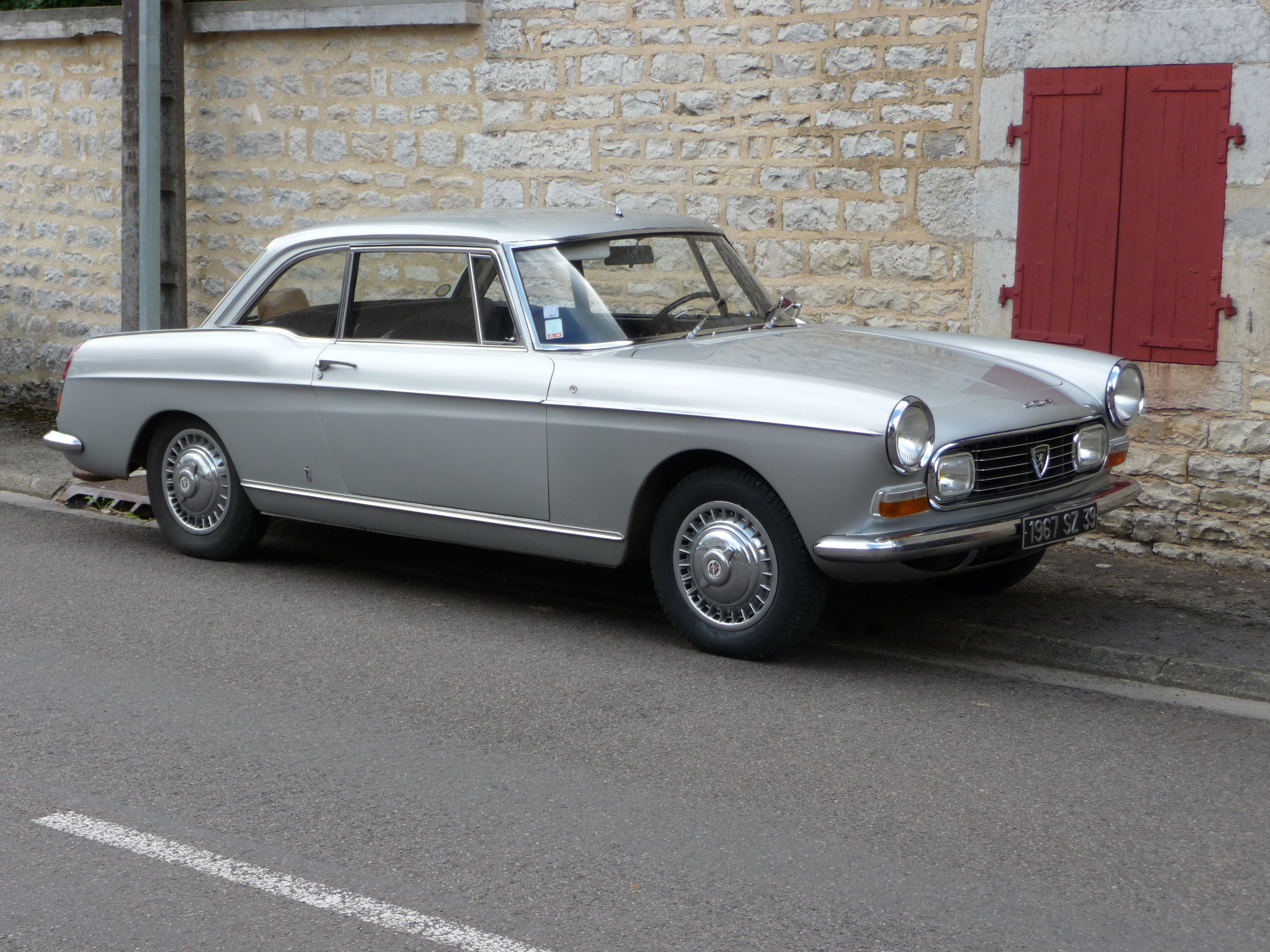
Peugeot 404 coupé

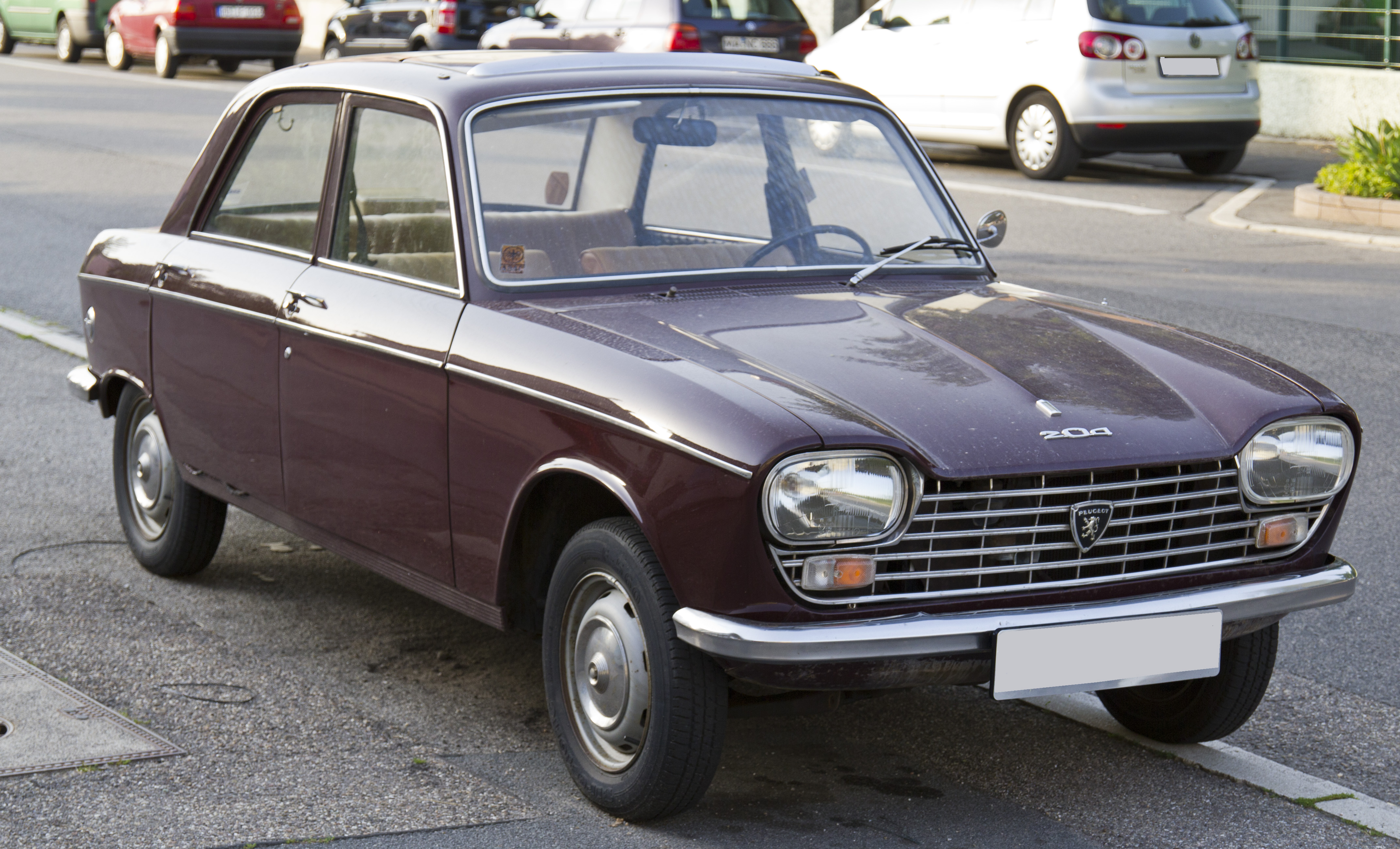
The Peugeot 204 was the manufacturer's first front wheel drive model and the best selling car in France in 1969, 1970 and 1971.

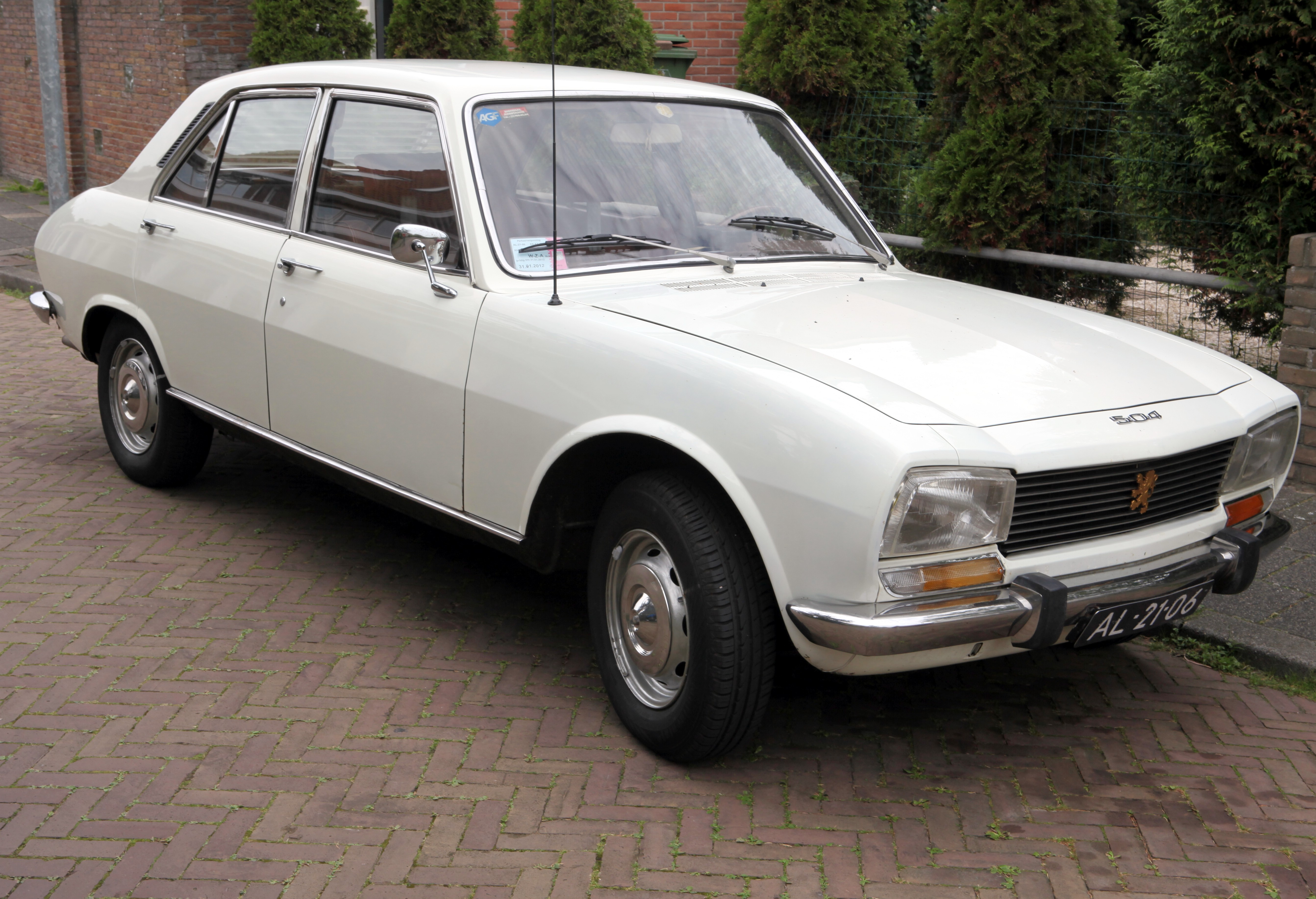
Peugeot 504, 1969 European Car of the Year

=== Takeover of Citroën and Chrysler Europe ===
In 1974, Peugeot bought a 30% share of Citroën and took over it completely in 1975 after the French government gave large sums of money to the new company. Citroën was in financial trouble because it developed too many radical new models for its financial resources. Some of them, notably the Citroën SM and the Comotor Wankel engine venture proved unprofitable. Others, the Citroën CX and Citroën GS for example, proved very successful in the marketplace.

The joint parent company became the PSA Peugeot Citroën group, which aimed to keep separate identities for both the Peugeot and Citroën brands while sharing engineering and technical resources. Peugeot thus briefly controlled the Italian Maserati marque, but disposed of it in May 1975.

The group then took over the European division of Chrysler (which were formerly Rootes and Simca) in 1978 as the American auto manufacturer struggled to survive. Soon, the whole Chrysler/Simca range was sold under the revived Talbot badge until the production of Talbot-branded passenger cars was shelved in 1987 and on commercial vehicles in 1992.

=== 1980s and 1990s ===
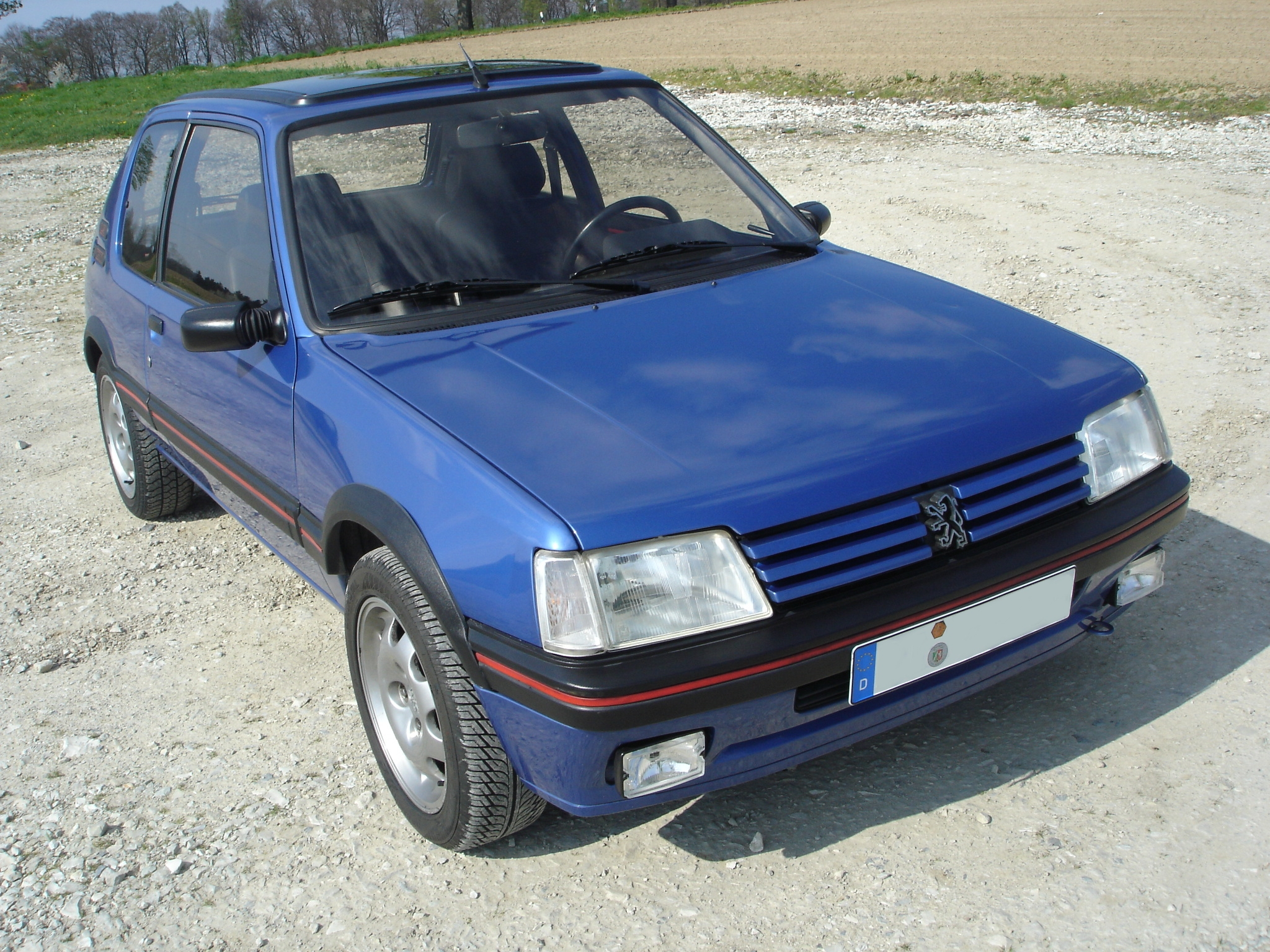
Peugeot 205

In 1983, Peugeot launched the successful Peugeot 205 supermini, which is largely credited for turning the company's fortunes around. The 205 was regularly the bestselling car in France, and was also popular in other parts of Europe, including Britain, where sales regularly topped 50,000 a year by the late 1980s. It won plaudits for its styling, ride and handling. It remained on sale in many markets until 1998, overlapping with the introduction of the 106 in 1991, and ceasing production at the launch of the 206, the best-selling Peugeot model of all time, with 8,358,217 cars sold by 2012.

As part of the Guangzhou Peugeot Automobile Company (GPAC) joint venture, the Peugeot 504 and 505 were built in China from 1985 to 1997.

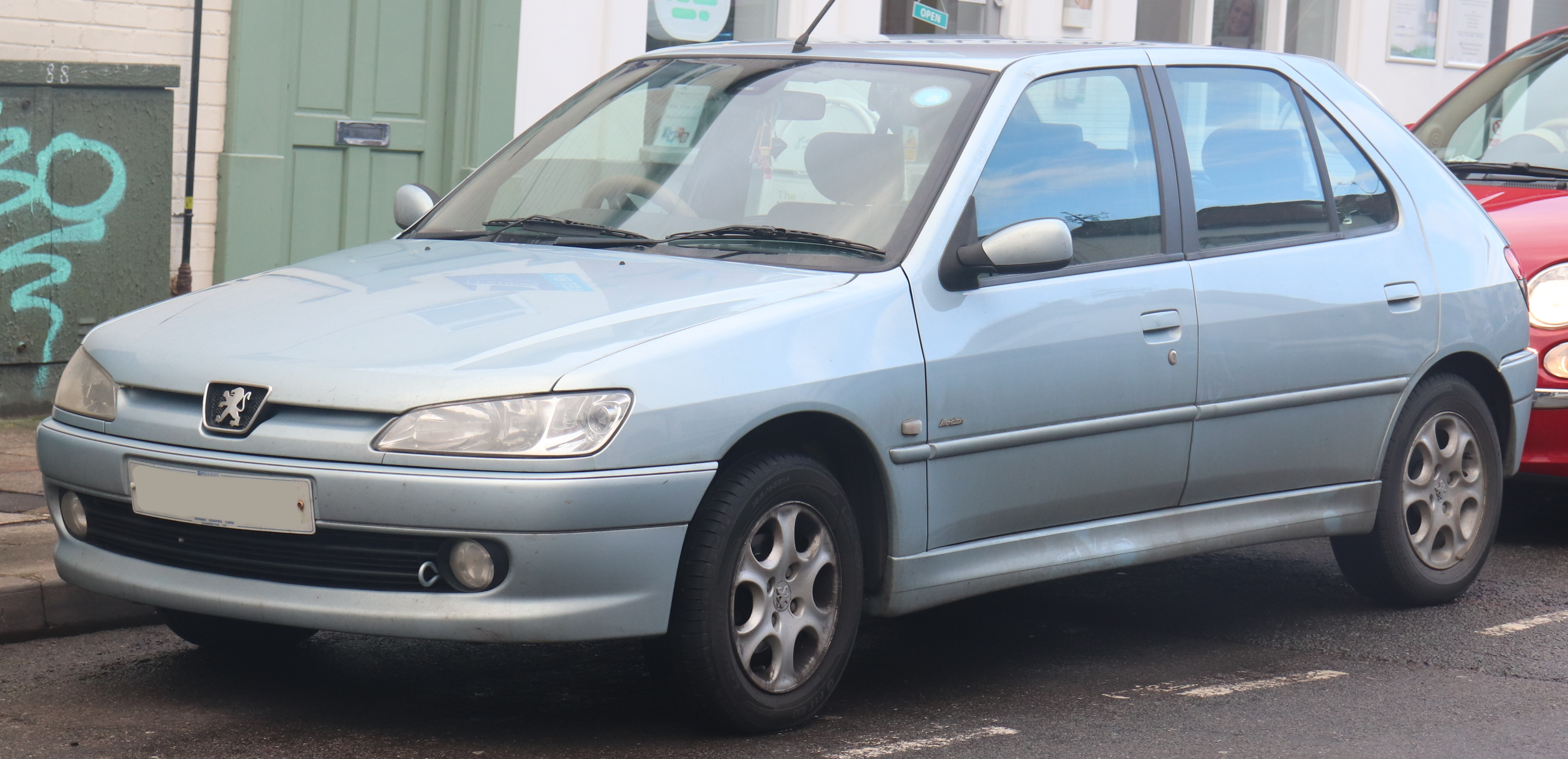
Peugeot 306

By 1987, the company had dropped the Talbot brand for passenger cars when it ceased production of the Simca-based Horizon, Alpine, and Solara models, as well as the Talbot Samba supermini which was based on the Peugeot 104. What was to be called the Talbot Arizona became the Peugeot 309, with the former Rootes plant in Ryton and Simca plant in Poissy being turned over for Peugeot assembly. Producing Peugeots in Ryton was significant, as it signalled the first time Peugeots would be built in Britain. The 309 was the first Peugeot-badged hatchback of its size, and sold well across Europe. The 309's successor, the 306, was also built at Ryton.

The 405 saloon was launched in 1987 to compete with the likes of the Ford Sierra, and was voted European Car of the Year. This, too, was a popular car across Europe, and continued to be available in Africa and Asia after it was replaced by the 406 nearly a decade later. Production of the 405 in Europe was divided between Britain and France, although its 406 successor was only produced in France. The 106, Peugeot's entry-level model from 1991, was also produced solely in France.

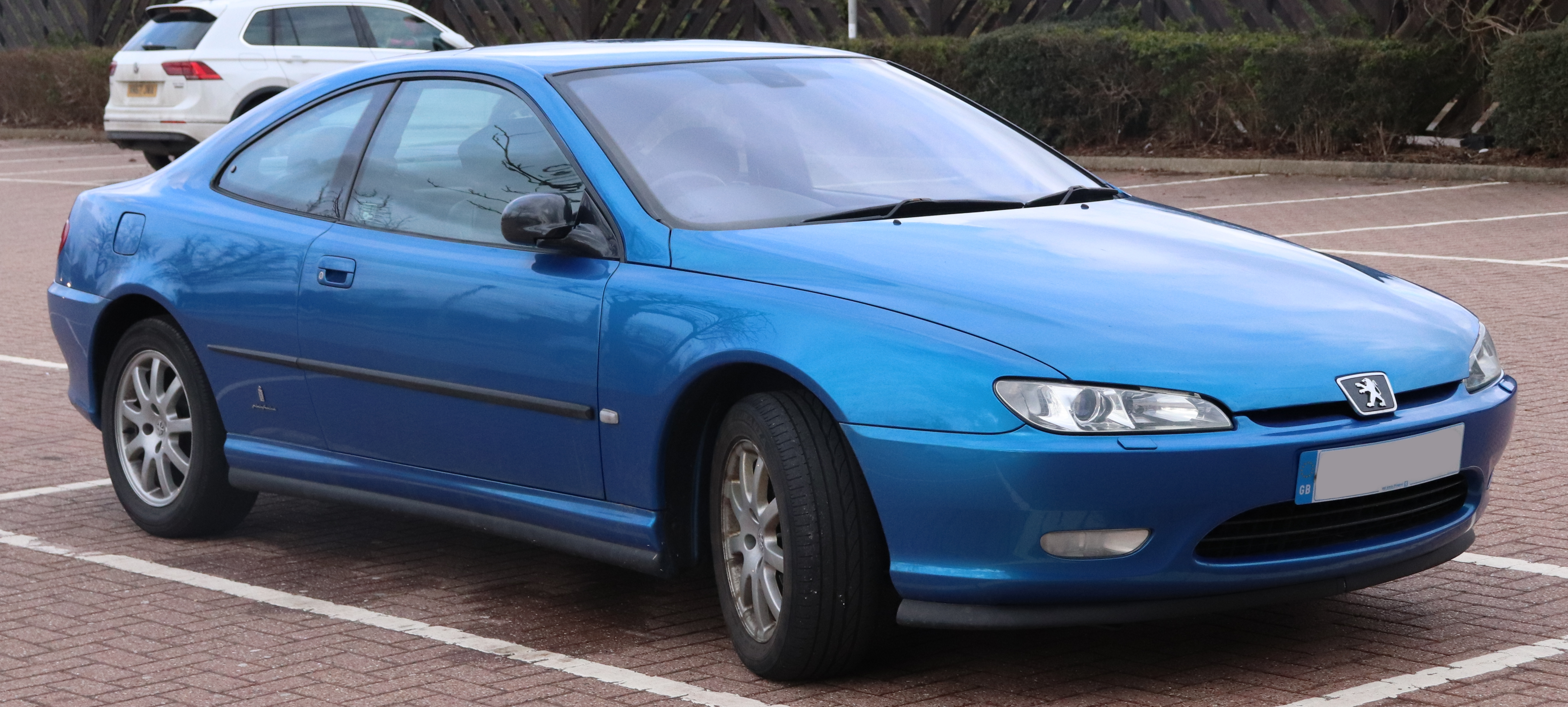
Peugeot 406 coupé

The Talbot name survived for a little longer on commercial vehicles until 1992 before being shelved completely. As experienced by other European volume car makers, Peugeot's United States and Canadian sales faltered and finally became uneconomical, as the Peugeot 505 design aged. For a time, distribution in the Canadian market was handled by Chrysler. Several ideas to turn around sales in the United States, such as including the Peugeot 205 in its lineup, were considered but not pursued. In the early 1990s, the newly introduced 405 proved uncompetitive with domestic and import models in the same market segment, and sold less than 1,000 units. Total sales fell to 4,261 units in 1990 and 2,240 through July 1991, which caused the company to cease its U.S. and Canada operations after 33 years.

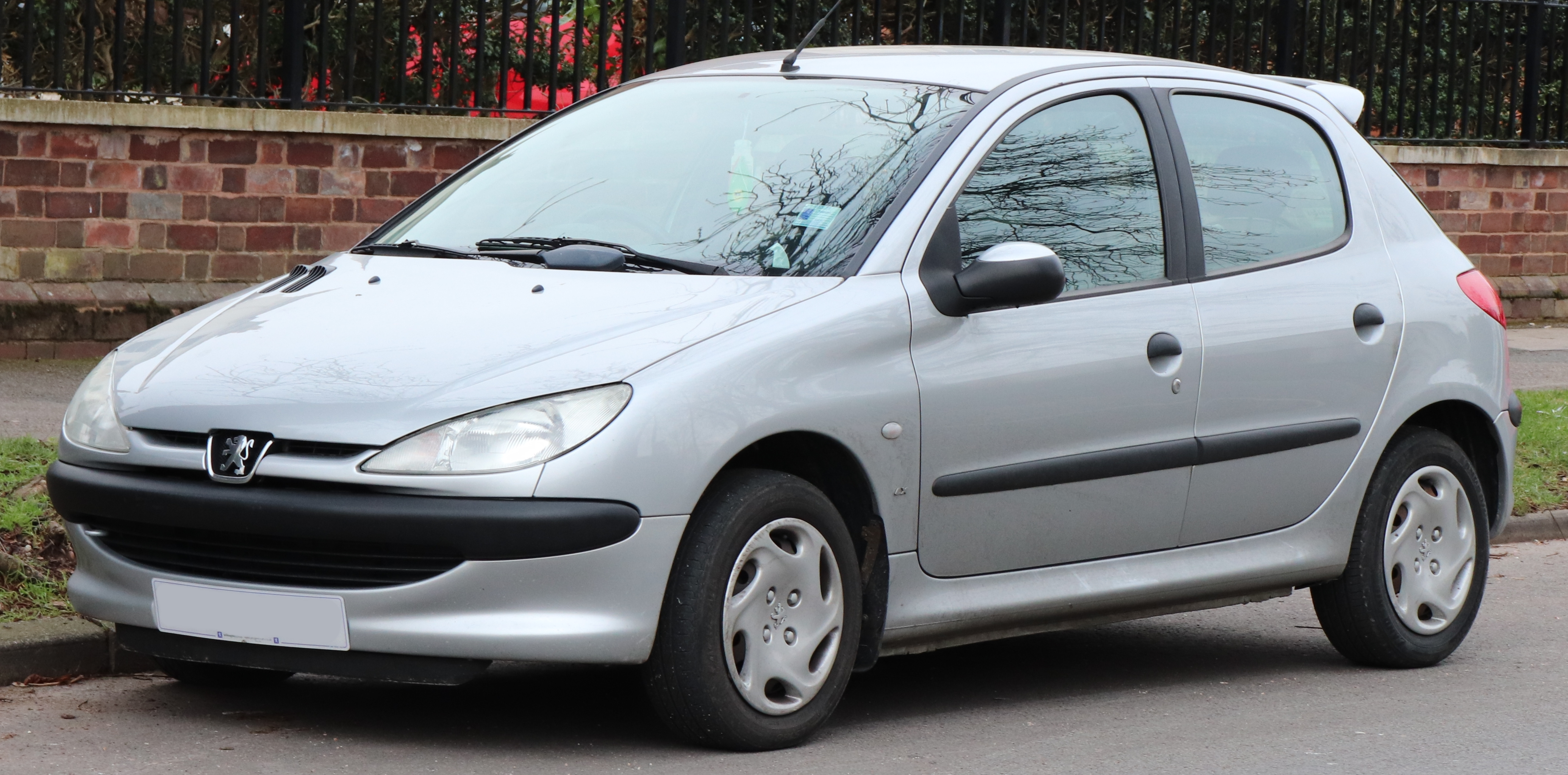
Peugeot 206

In 1997, just six years after pulling out of both United States and Canadian markets, Peugeot returned to Mexico after a 36-year absence, under the Chile–Mexico Free Trade Agreement. However, Peugeot models (1997–present) are not to be bought or imported into the United States from Mexico.

=== 2000s to present ===
On 18 April 2006, PSA Peugeot Citroën announced the closure of the Ryton manufacturing facility in Coventry, England. This announcement resulted in the loss of 2,300 jobs, as well as about 5,000 jobs in the supply chain. The plant produced its last Peugeot 206 on 12 December 2006, and finally closed down in January 2007.

Peugeot set an ambitious target of selling 4 million units annually by the end of the decade. In 2008, its sales stayed below the 2 million mark. In mid-2009, "adverse market and industry conditions" were blamed for falls in sales and operating losses. Christian Streiff was replaced by Philippe Varin (CEO) and Jean-Pierre Ploué (head of design) was transferred from his post at Citroën. In 2009, Peugeot returned to the Canadian market with the scooter brand only.

Peugeot still plans on developing new models to compete in segments where it currently does not compete. Collin said that the French automaker competed in 72% of market segments in 2007, but he wanted to get that figure up to 90%. Despite Peugeot's sportscar racing program, the company is not prepared to build a pure sportscar any more hardcore than the RC Z sports-coupe. It is also pursuing government funding to develop a diesel-hybrid drivetrain, which might be key to its expansion.

Peugeot's previous logo was introduced on 8 January 2010 and it was used around 11 years until 24 February 2021

By 2010, Peugeot planned on pursuing new markets, mainly in China, Russia, and South America. In 2011 it decided to re-enter India after 14 years with a new factory at Sanand, Gujarat.

Peugeot re-entered the Philippines in 2012 after having a short presence in 2005 with distribution done by the Alvarez Group.

In March 2012, General Motors purchased a 7% share in Peugeot for 320 million euros as part of a cooperation aimed at finding savings through joint purchasing and product development. In December 2013, GM sold its entire Peugeot stake, taking a loss of about 70 million euros.

In October 2013, Peugeot closed its production plant at Aulnay-sous-Bois as part of a restructuring plan to reduce overcapacity in the face of a shrinking domestic market. By December 2013, Chinese investors were rumoured to be potential investors. In February 2014, the Peugeot family agreed to give up control of the company by reducing its holdings from 25% to 14%. As part of this agreement, Dongfeng Motors and the French government were each to buy 14% stakes in the company, creating three partners with equal voting rights. The board of directors was to be composed of six independent members, two representatives of each Dongfeng, the French state and the Peugeot family, and two members representing employees and employees shareholders. The French government took the view the deal did not require approval by Brussels as EU competition rules do not count public investment in a company on the same terms as a private investor as state aid. The equity participation by Dongfeng expanded an already budding relationship with Peugeot. The pair at the time were jointly operating three car-manufacturing plants in China, with a capacity of producing 750,000 vehicles a year. In July 2014, the joint venture, Dongfeng Peugeot-Citroën, disclosed it was building a fourth factory in China in Chengdu, in Sichuan Province, targeting the manufacture of 300,000 sport-utility and multipurpose vehicles a year, starting towards the end of 2016. In January 2015, Indian multinational automotive giant Mahindra & Mahindra purchased a major stake of 51% of Peugeot Motocycles for a price of 28 million euro.

In 2015, the Spanish National Commission on Markets and Competition fined Peugeot España, S.A. with over 15 million euros because it operated a cartel with other car builders and sellers controlling 91% of the Spanish market between 2006 and 2013. They shared information about sales and repairs anti-competitively.

In 2020, it was announced that a merger of Fiat Chrysler Automobiles (FCA) and PSA is expected to be completed in the first quarter of 2021. The combined company will be called Stellantis. The merger was confirmed on 4 January 2021, after an overwhelming vote of shareholders from both companies and the deal officially closed on 16 January 2021.

== List of CEOs ==
- Frédéric Saint-Geours (1998–2007)
- Jean-Philippe Collin (2007–2010)
- Vincent Rambaud (2010–2012)
- Maxime Picat (2012–2016)
- Jean-Philippe Imparato (2016–2021)
- Linda Jackson (2021–2025)
- Alain Favey (2025–present)

== Factories ==
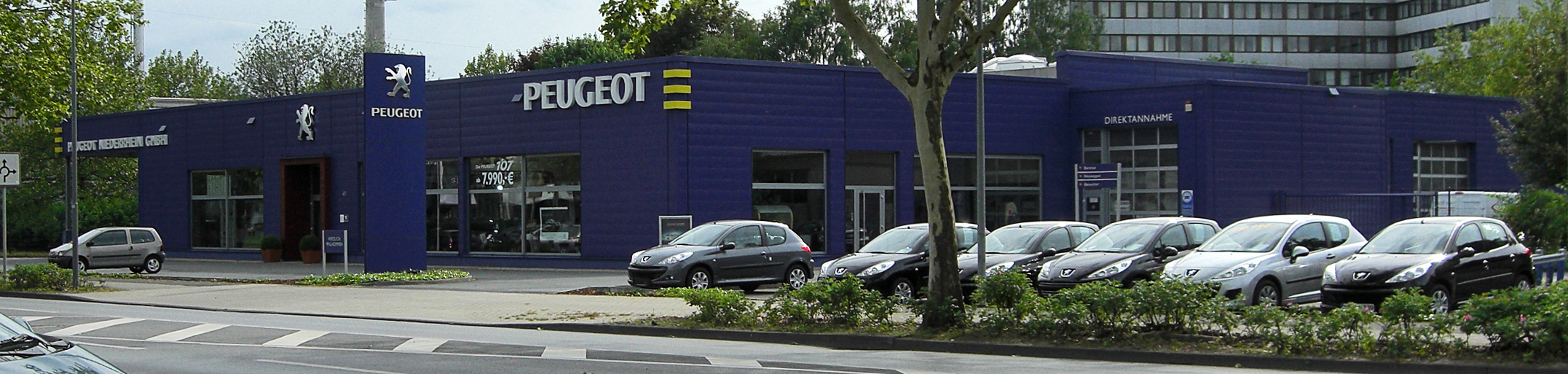
A Peugeot dealership in Ratingen, Germany

=== Stellantis plants ===
- France (Stellantis Poissy Plant): DS 3 Crossback
- France (Stellantis Mulhouse Plant): Peugeot 2008, Peugeot 508 (Second Generation)
- France (Stellantis Sochaux Plant): Peugeot 308, Peugeot 3008, Peugeot 5008 (First Generation)
- France (Stellantis Rennes Plant): Peugeot 508, Peugeot 5008 (Second Generation)
- Algeria (Oran): Peugeot 208
- Argentina (Buenos Aires): 208, 308, 408
- Brazil (Porto Real): Peugeot 208, Peugeot 2008
- Portugal (Stellantis Mangualde Plant): Peugeot Partner
- Slovakia (Stellantis Trnava Plant): Peugeot 208
- Spain (Madrid): 207 Plus, 207 CC
- Spain (Stellantis Vigo Plant): Peugeot Partner, Peugeot 301

=== Joint venture and outsourced plants ===
- Austria (Graz under contract by Magna Steyr): Peugeot RCZ
- Azerbaijan (Neftchala assembly under contract to Iran Khodro): 206 and 405
- China (Wuhan), joint venture Dongfeng Peugeot-Citroën: 206 Plus, 307, 308, 408, 508
- Czech Republic (Kolín), Toyota Peugeot Citroën Automobile Czech: Peugeot 107, Peugeot 108
- France (joint venture Sevel Nord near Valenciennes): Peugeot Expert
- Iran (Tehran) assembly under contract to Iran Khodro: 206, 206 Sedan, 207i (206 plus), 405 and joint venture IKAP: 208, 2008, 301, 508
- Italy (Atessa), joint venture Sevel: Peugeot Boxer
- Japan, (Mizushima) under contract by Mitsubishi Motors: Peugeot iOn
- Malaysia (Gurun) assembly under contract to Naza Automotive Manufacturing: 208, 2008, 308, 408, 508, 5008
- Netherlands NedCar (former): Peugeot 4007
- Dangote Peugeot Automobiles Nigeria: Peugeot 301
- Russia (Kaluga), joint venture Peugeot Citroën Mitsubishi Automotiv: Peugeot 4007, Peugeot 308 (First Generation)
- Tunisia (Fouchana): Peugeot Pick Up
- Turkey (Bursa), under contract by Tofaş: Peugeot Bipper
- Vietnam (Ho Chi Minh City), joint venture THACO Group: Peugeot 408
- Pakistan (Karachi), JV Lucky Motors Cooperations: Peugeot 2008

== Vehicles ==
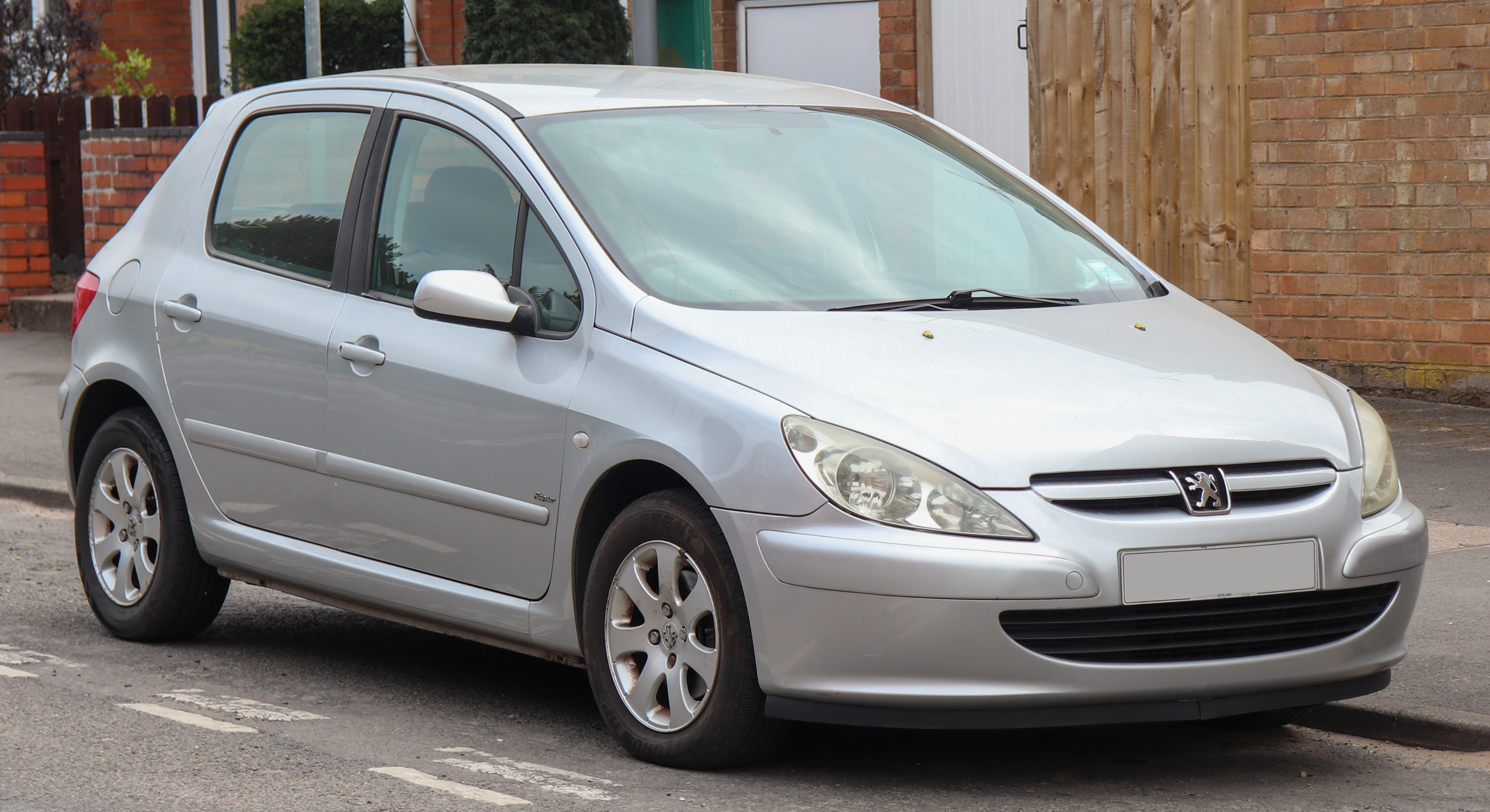
Peugeot 307, 2002 European Car of the Year

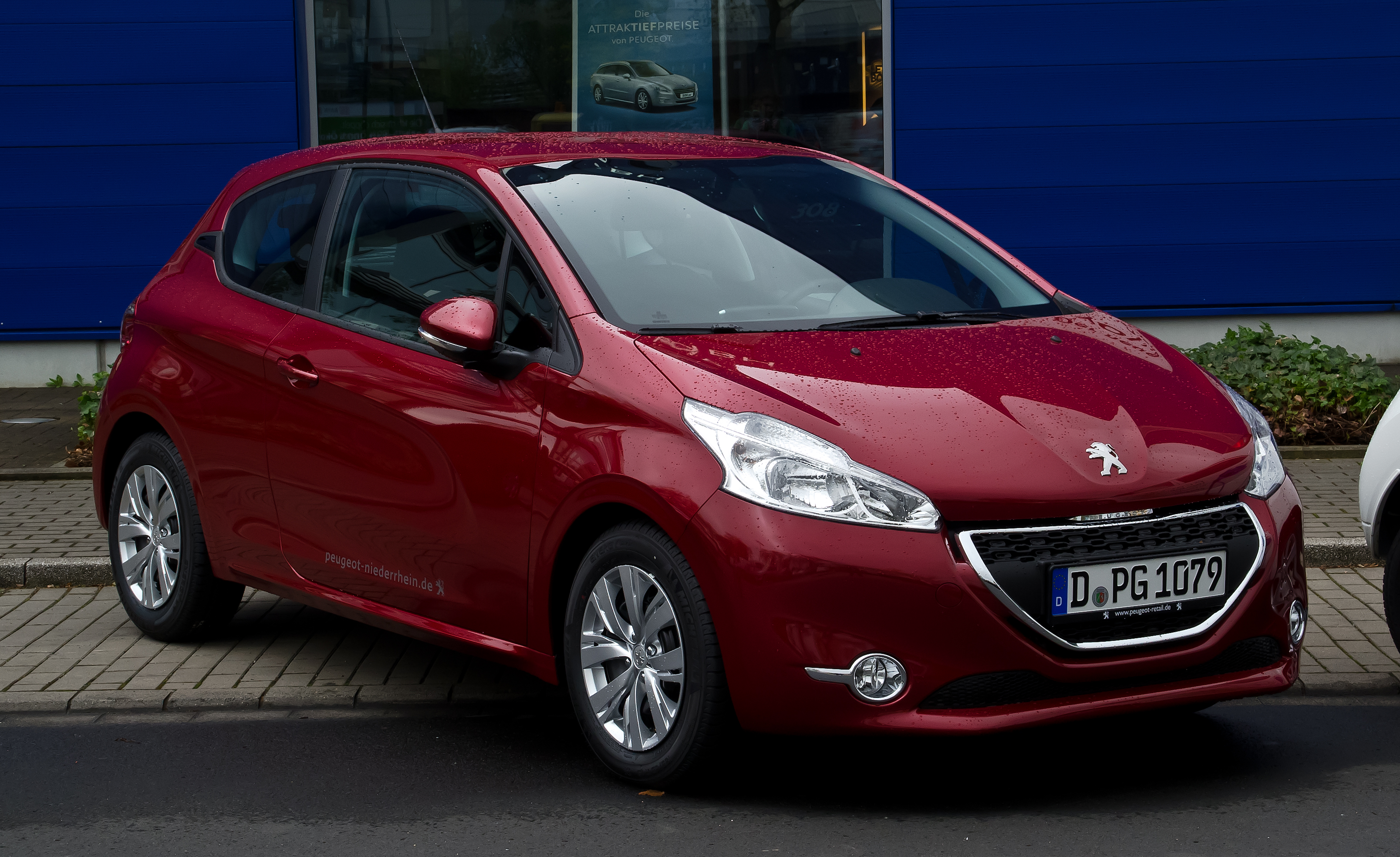
Peugeot 208, 2013 Car of the Year in Italy and Spain

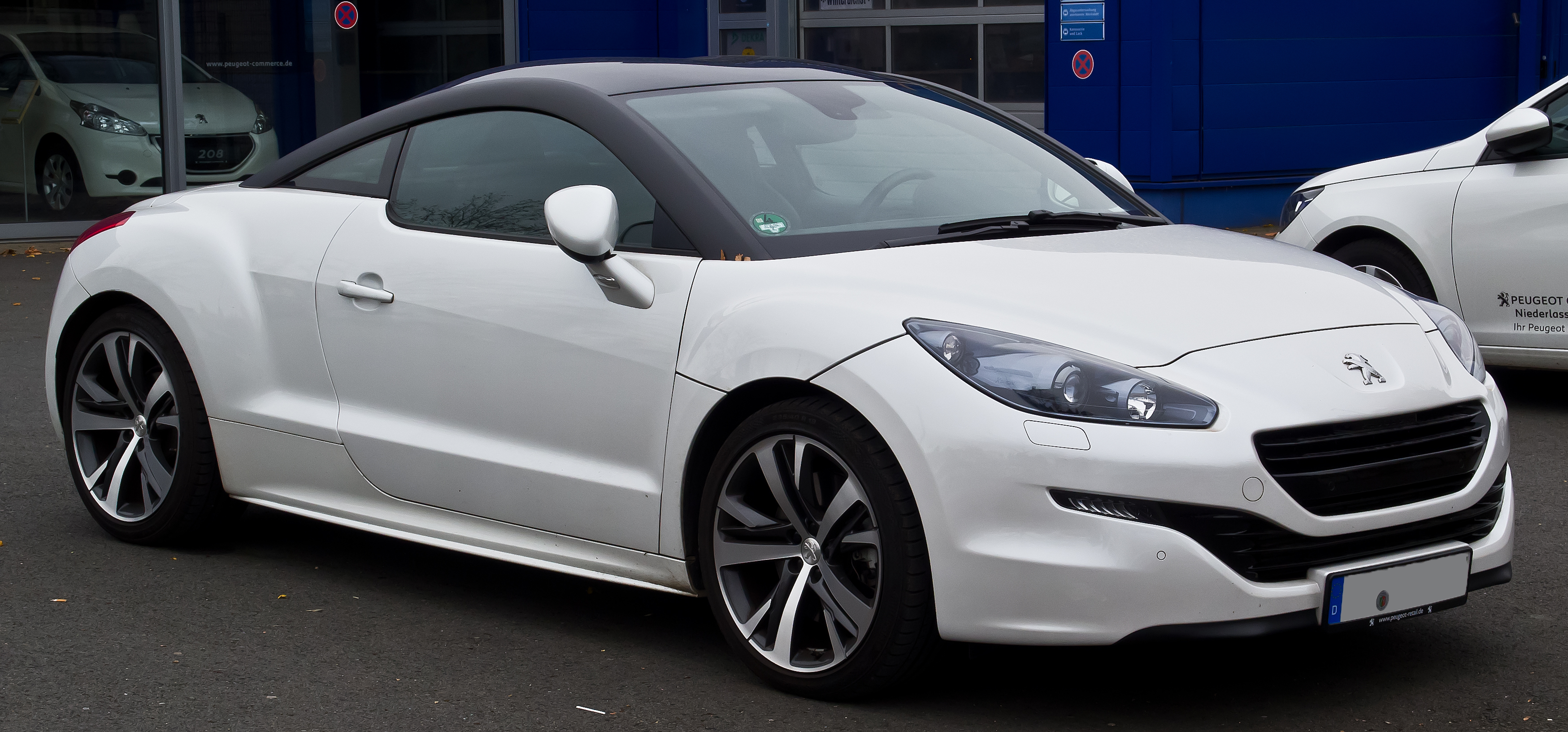
Peugeot RCZ, Diesel Car magazine 'Sports Car of the Year' five years in a row and the Top Gear 2010 Coupé of the Year

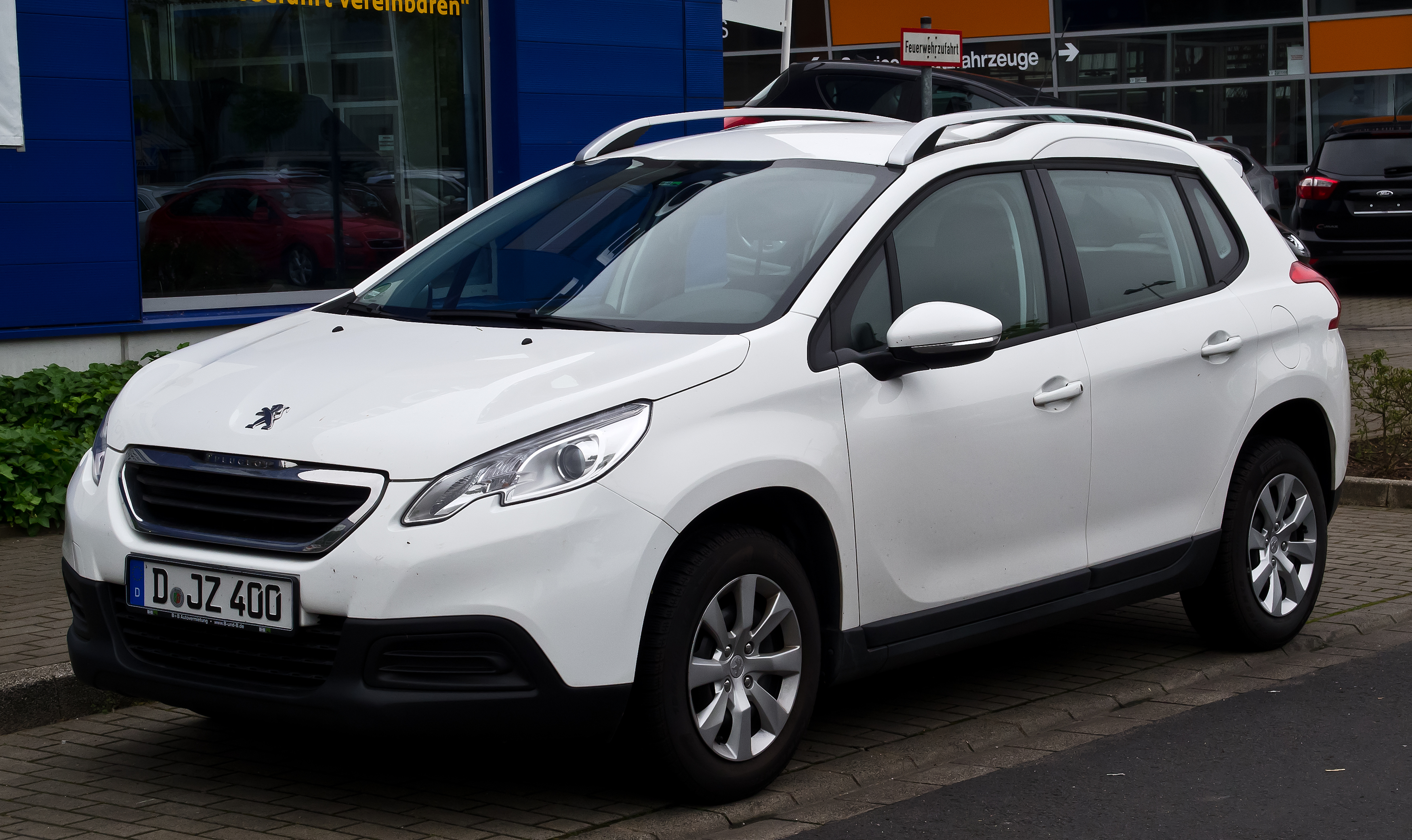
Peugeot 2008, 2014 Car of the Year in Italy

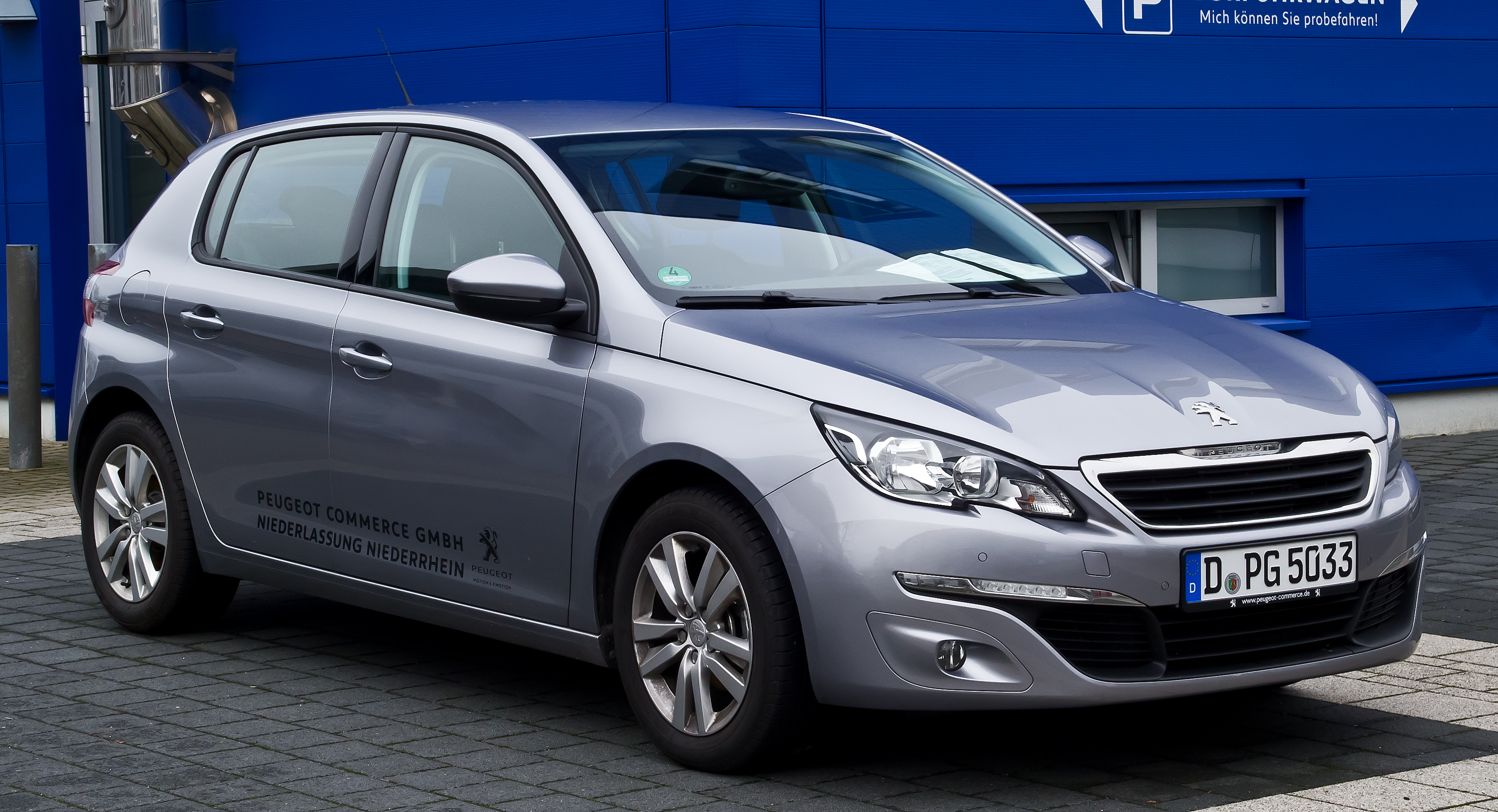
Peugeot 308, 2014 European Car of the Year

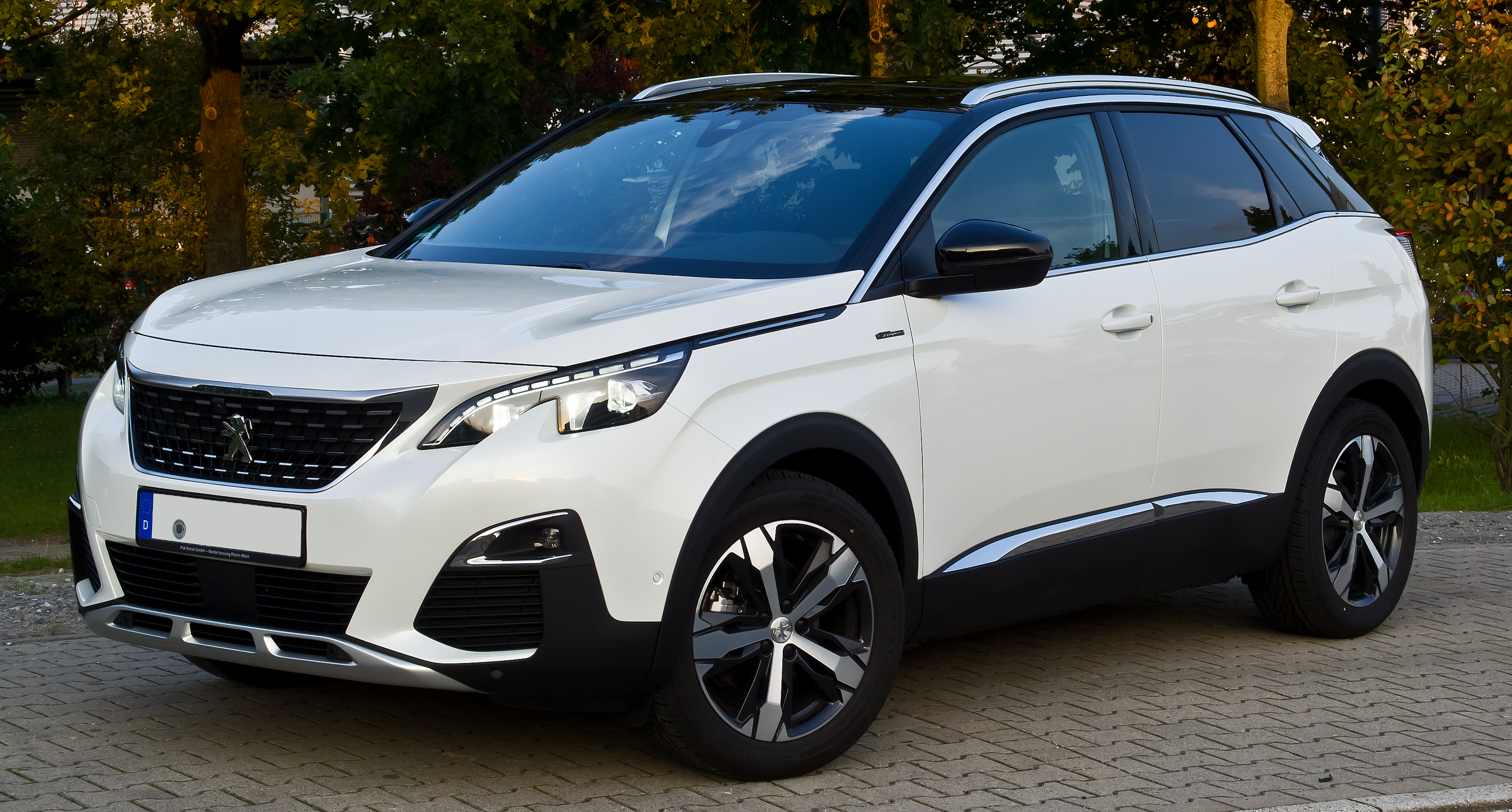
Peugeot 3008, 2017 European Car of the Year

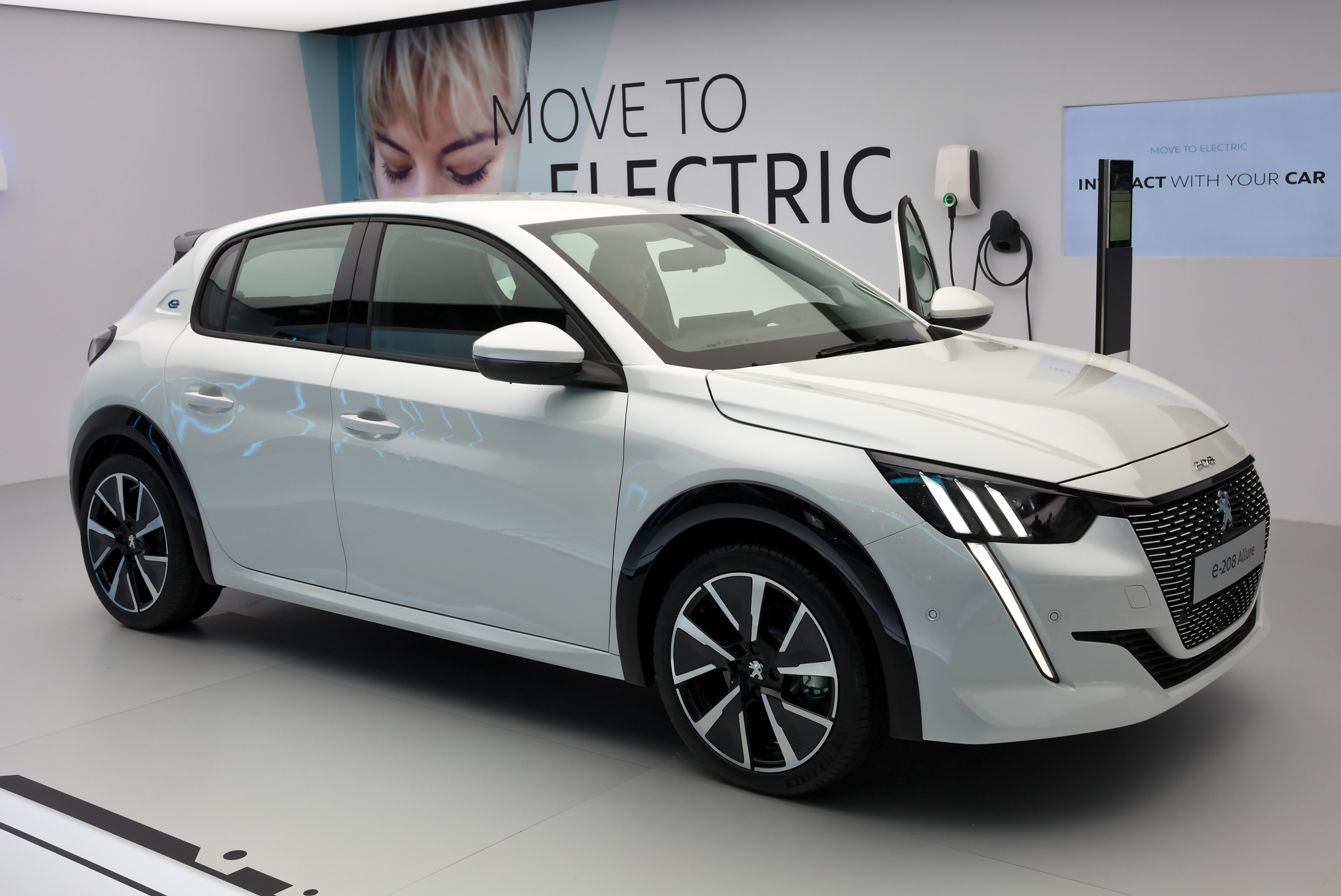
Peugeot 208, 2020 European Car of the Year

=== Awards ===
==== European Car of the Year ====
Peugeot has produced six winners of the European Car of the Year

- 1969 – Peugeot 504
- 1988 – Peugeot 405
- 2002 – Peugeot 307
- 2014 – Peugeot 308
- 2017 – Peugeot 3008
- 2020 – Peugeot 208

Four other Peugeot models got either second or third in the contest.

- 1980 – Peugeot 505
- 1984 – Peugeot 205
- 1996 – Peugeot 406
- 1999 – Peugeot 206

Women's World Car Of The Year

- 2022 - Peugeot 308

==== Semperit Irish Car of the Year award ====
Peugeot has produced two Car of the Year award winners in Ireland since 1978. It is judged by the Irish Motoring Writers Association (IMWA).

- 1997 – Peugeot 406
- 2010 – Peugeot 3008

==== Car of the Year award in Italy ====
Peugeot has produced four "Car of the Year Auto Europa" award winners in Italy in 28 years, since 1987. "Auto Europa" is the prize awarded by the jury of the Italian Union of Automotive Journalists (UIGA), which annually celebrates the best car produced at least at 10,000 units in the 27 countries of the European Union, and sold between September and August the previous year.

- 2007 – Peugeot 207
- 2010 – Peugeot 3008
- 2013 – Peugeot 208
- 2014 – Peugeot 2008
- 2015 – Peugeot 308

==== Car of the Year award in Spain ====
Peugeot has produced nine Car of the year award winners in Spain in 40 years, since 1974.

- 1981 – Talbot Horizon
- 1985 – Peugeot 205
- 1999 – Peugeot 206
- 2002 – Peugeot 307
- 2005 – Peugeot 407
- 2006 – Peugeot 1007
- 2007 – Peugeot 207
- 2012 – Peugeot 508
- 2013 – Peugeot 208

==== Best Used Small Car of the Year ====
- 2022 – Peugeot 208

==== Best-Selling Car in Europe ====
- 2022 – Peugeot 208

=== Numbers ===
- 100-Series: 104 (1972–1988), 106 (1991–2003), 107 (2005–2014), 108 (2014–2021)
- 200-Series: 201 (1929–1937), 202 (1938–1949), 203 (1948–1960), 204 (1965–1976), 205 (1983–1998), 206 (1998–2013), 207 (2006–2014), 208 (2012–present)
- 300-Series: 301 (Original) (1932–1936), 302 (1936–1938), 304 (1969–1980), 305 (1977–1989), 309 (1985–1994), 306 (1993–2002), 307 (2001–2008), 308 (2007–present), 301 (Africa/Balkans/China/Central Europe/Eastern Europe/Kazakhstan/Latin America/Middle East/Spain/Taiwan) (2012–present)
- 400-Series: 401 (1934–1935), 402 (1935–1942), 403 (1955–1966), 404 (1960–1975), 405 (1987–1997), 406 (1995–2004), 407 (2004–2011), 408 (2010–present)
- 500-Series: 504 (1968–1983), 505 (1979–1992), 508 (2010–present)
- 600-Series: 601 (1934–1935), 604 (1975–1985), 605 (1989–1999), 607 (1999–2010)
- 800-Series: 806 (1994–2002), 807 (2002–2014)
- 900-Series: 905 (1990–1993), 908 (2011), 9X8 (2022)
- 1000-Series: 1007 (2004–2009)
- 2000-Series: 2008 (2013–present)
- 3000-Series: 3008 (2008–present)
- 4000-Series: 4007 (2007–2012), 4008 (Europe) (2012–2016), 4008 (China) (2016–present)
- 5000-Series: 5008 (2009–present)

=== Others ===
- Bipper
- Boxer
- DMA/DMAH
- D3/D3A
- D4/D4A
- Expert
- Hoggar (a pickup designed and manufactured in Brazil since 2010)
- J5/J7/J9
- P4
- Pars (also known as Persia)
- Partner
- RCZ (2010)
- Type 15
- VLV
- iOn
- Pick Up

=== Electric and hybrid vehicles ===
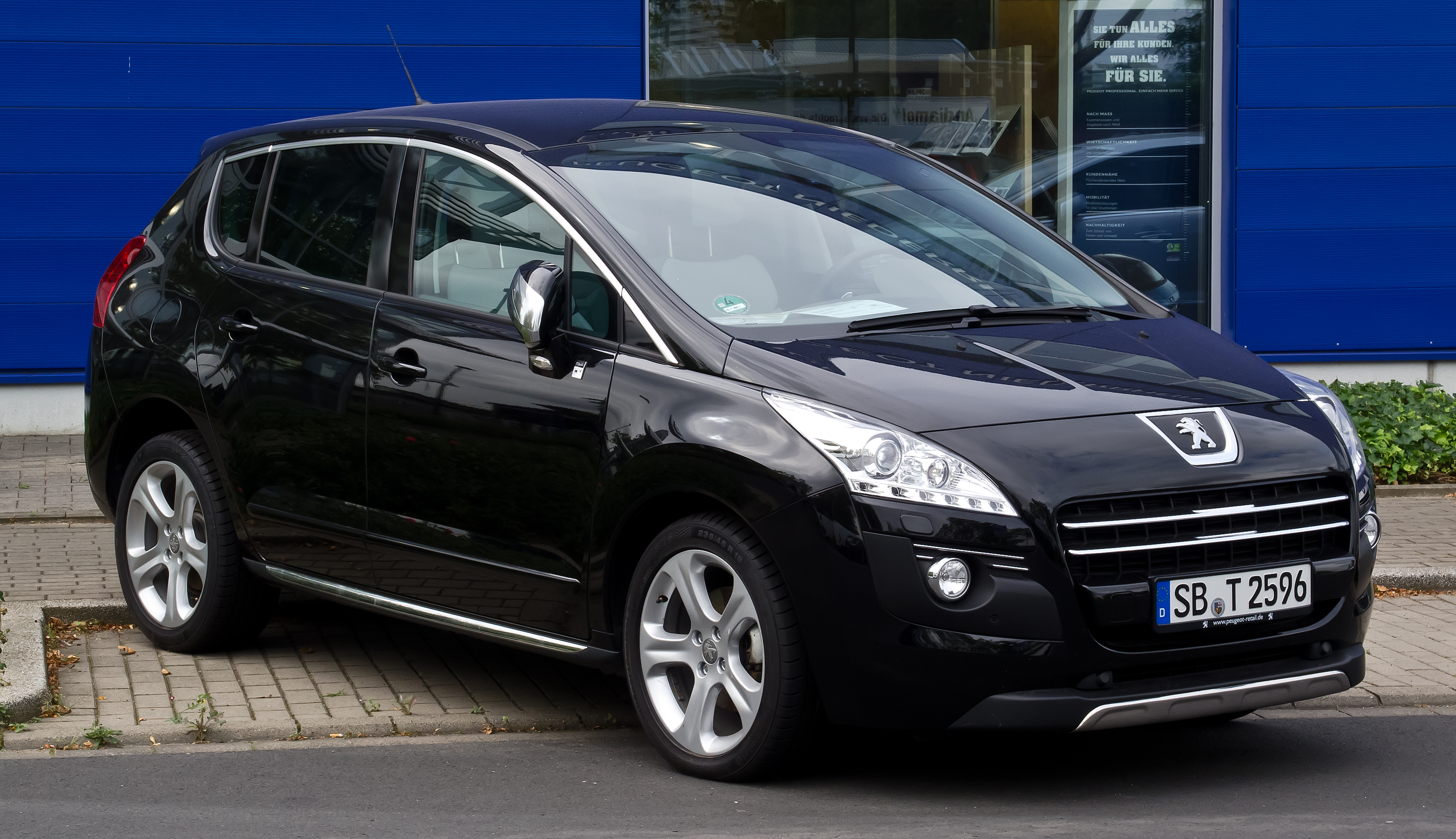
Peugeot 3008 HYbrid4, German model

Peugeot presented a new concept hybrid electric sports sedan at the 2008 Paris Motor Show called the Peugeot RC HYmotion4. Similar to the drivetrain model used in the upcoming Chevrolet Volt, the RC concept promises the ability to run solely on electric power for extended periods, with a hybrid electric powertrain filling in the gaps when extra range is needed. The RC HYmotion4 includes a 70-kW electric motor at the front wheels. The Peugeot Prologue HYmotion4 was also shown at the 2008 Paris show and is in many ways the opposite of the RC HYmotion4 concept. The Prologue puts the internal combustion engine up front and runs on diesel instead of gasoline, with the electric motor going at the back.

The Peugeot BB1 is an electric concept car with in-wheel motors in its rear wheels first shown in September 2009 at the Frankfurt Motor Show.

In 2010, Peugeot started selling the electric Peugeot iOn, a rebadged and revised version of the Mitsubishi i-MiEV.

Peugeot VELV electric concept car was presented on 26 September 2011.

By 2025, it is expected that 100% of Peugeot models would introduce an electrified variant. It is estimated that by 2030, 100% of Peugeot sold in Europe would be electrified. Along with adopting an all-electricity approach, Peugeot also aims to reduce its CO_{2} emissions. Peugeot's aim is to implement its brand shift to sustainable and environmental-friendly transport solutions.

== Motorsport ==
=== Early ===
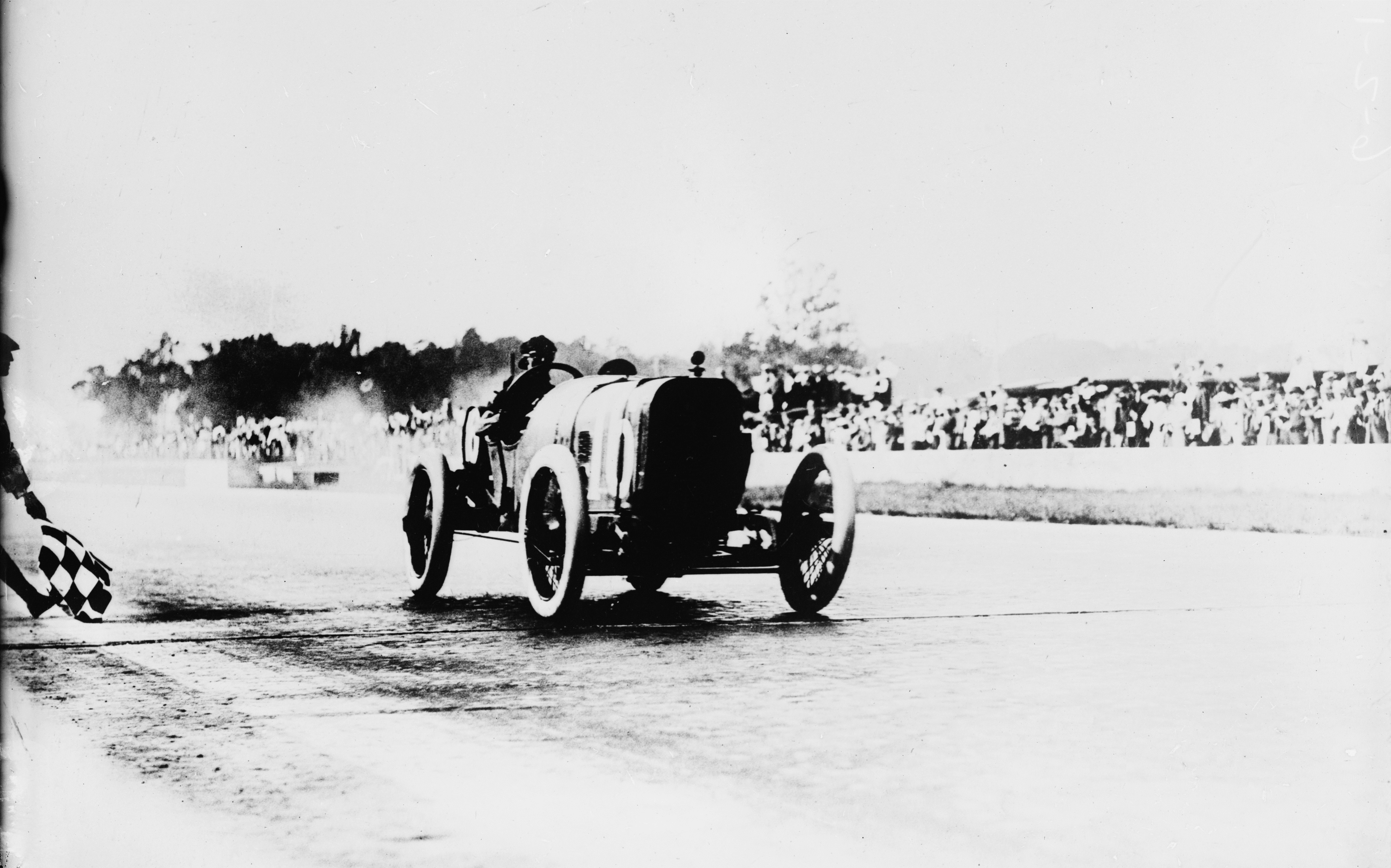
Peugeot wins the 1913 Indianapolis 500

Peugeot was involved in motorsport from the earliest days and entered five cars for the Paris-Rouen Trials in 1894 with one of them, driven by Lemaître, finishing second (the winning car was a steam-powered car and was therefore disqualified meaning Lemître was promoted to first). These trials are usually regarded as the first motor sporting competition. Participation in a variety of events continued until World War I, but in 1912, Peugeot made its most notable contribution to motor sporting history when one of its cars, driven by Georges Boillot, won the French Grand Prix at Dieppe. This revolutionary car was powered by a straight-4 engine designed by Ernest Henry under the guidance of the technically knowledgeable racing drivers Paul Zuccarelli and Georges Boillot. The design was very influential for racing engines as it featured for the first time DOHC and four valves per cylinder, providing for high engine speeds, a radical departure from previous racing engines which relied on huge displacement for power.

In 1913, Peugeots of similar design to the 1912 Grand Prix car won the French Grand Prix at Amiens and the Indianapolis 500. When one of the Peugeot racers remained in the United States during World War I and parts could not be acquired from France for the 1914 season, owner Bob Burman had it serviced in the shop of Harry Miller by a young mechanic named Fred Offenhauser. Their familiarity with the Peugeot engine was the basis of the famed Miller racing engine, which later developed into the Offenhauser.

=== Rallying ===
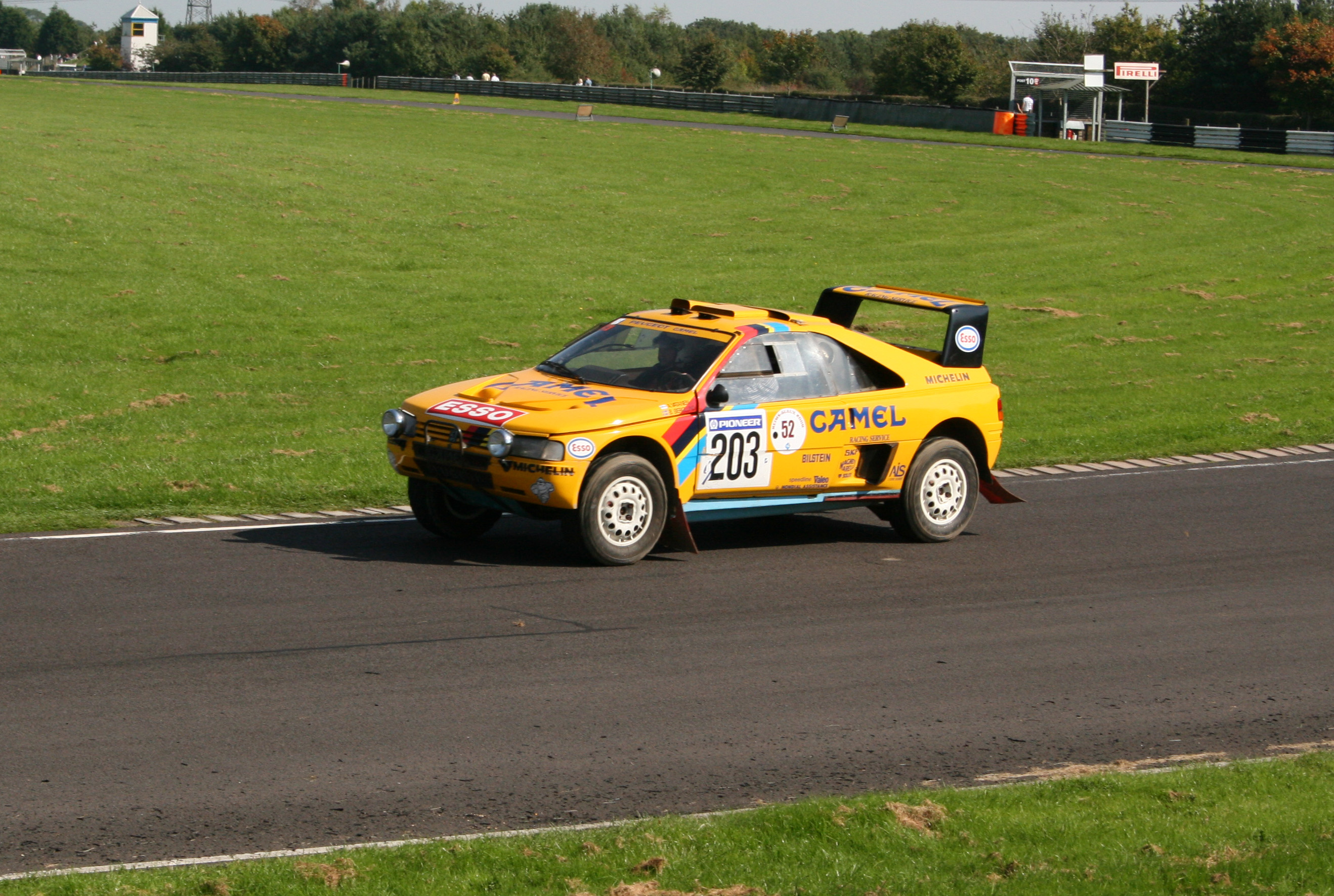
Peugeot 405 Turbo 16, 1989 and 1990 winner of the Dakar Rally, with Ari Vatanen

Peugeot Sport is one of the most successful winners in rallying, along with Citroën Racing (eight-time WRC winner), by winning five times the World Rally Championship Manufacturer's Title (1985–1986, 2000–2002), seven times the Dakar Rally (1987–1990, 2016–2018), three times the European Rally Championship (2002–2003, 2008), three times the Intercontinental Rally Challenge (2007–2009).

Peugeot's East African importers had an impressive record in rallying in the 1960s; Nick Nowicki and Paddy Cliff won the East African Safari in 1963 with a Marshall's-entered 404 sedan. In 1966 and 1967, Tanzania's Tanganyika Motors entered the winning 404 Injection sedan, piloted by the late Bert Shankland and Chris Rothwell. It might have won again in 1968, but while in second place, its engine blew and ultimately Nick Nowicki and Paddy Cliff upheld Peugeot's honour by winning the rally. Peugeot also won the Safari Rally in 1975 (Andersson in a 504 Injection sedan), then, in 1978 (Nicolas in a 504 Coupé V6), both cars being factory team entries.

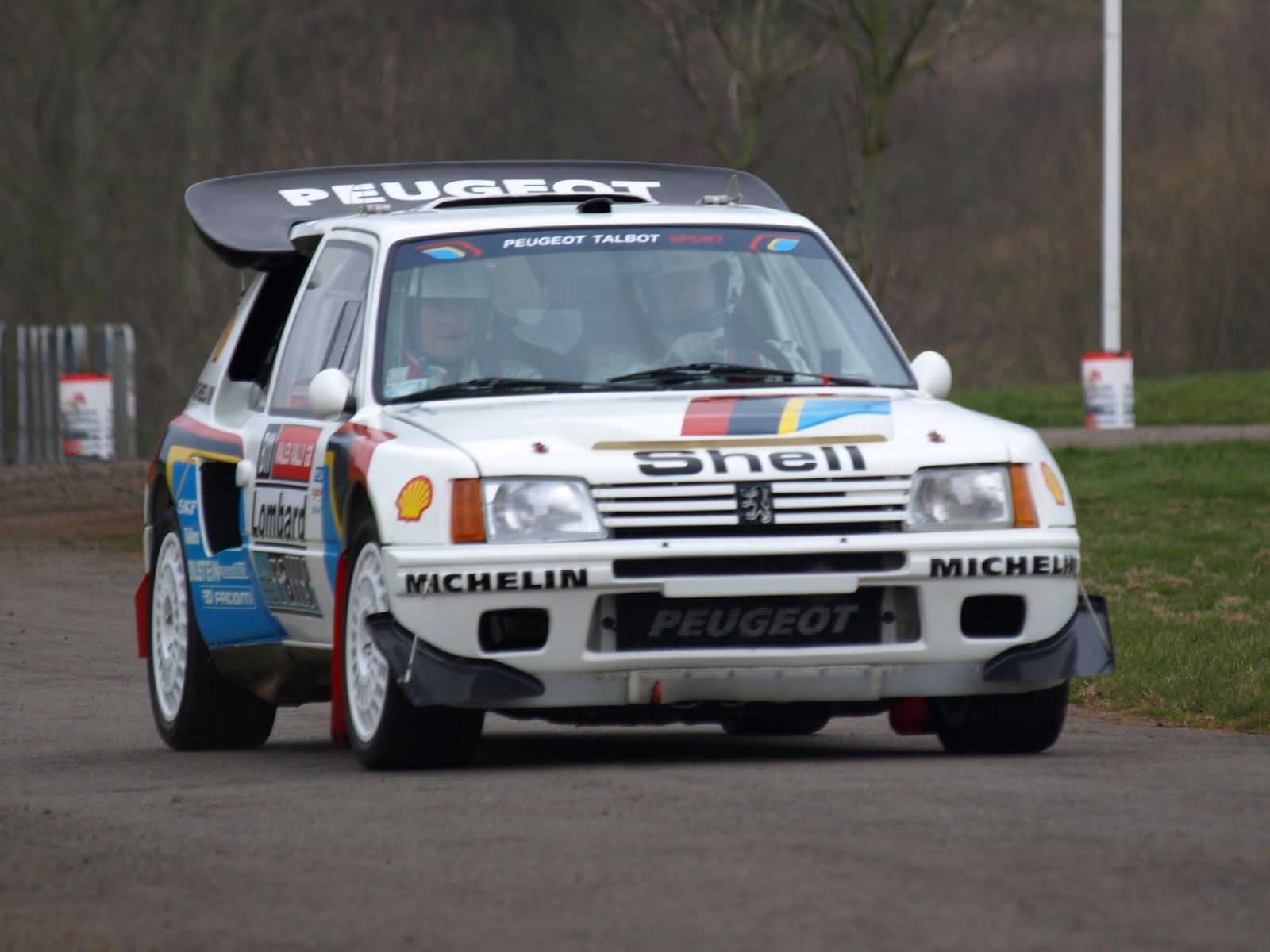
Peugeot 205 Turbo 16, 1985 and 1986 winner of the World Rally Championship

Peugeot also had further success in international rallying, including in the World Rally Championship, with the four-wheel-drive turbo-charged versions of the Peugeot 205, and later the Peugeot 206. In 1981, Jean Todt, former co-driver for Hannu Mikkola, Timo Mäkinen, and Guy Fréquelin, among others, was asked by Jean Boillot, the head of Automobiles Peugeot, to create a competition department for PSA Peugeot Citroën. The resulting Peugeot Talbot Sport, established at Bois de Boulogne near Paris, debuted its Group B 205 Turbo 16 at the 1984 Tour de Corse in May, and took its first world rally win that same year at the 1000 Lakes Rally in August, in the hands of Ari Vatanen. Excluding an endurance rally where Peugeot were not participating, Vatanen went on win five world rallies in a row.

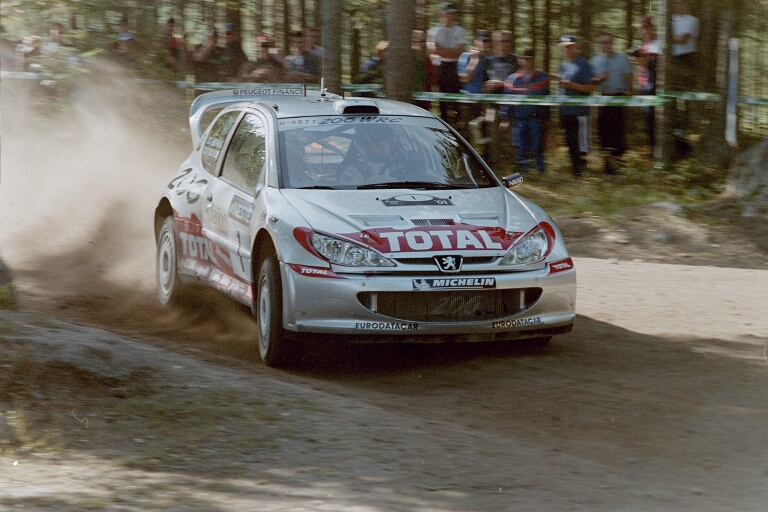
Peugeot 206 WRC, winner of the World Rally Championship from 2000 to 2002

Peugeot's domination continued in the 1985 season. Despite Vatanen's nearly fatal accident in Argentina, in the middle of the season, his teammate and compatriot Timo Salonen led Peugeot to its first drivers' and manufacturers' world championship titles, well ahead of Audi and its Audi Sport Quattro. In the 1986 season, Vatanen's young replacement Juha Kankkunen beat Lancia's Markku Alén to the drivers' title and Peugeot took its second manufacturers' title ahead of Lancia. Following FIA's banning of Group B cars for 1987, in May after Henri Toivonen's fatal accident, Todt was outraged and even (unsuccessfully) pursued legal action against the federation. Peugeot then switched to rally raids. Using the 205 and a 405, Peugeot won the Dakar Rally four times in a row from 1987 to 1990; three times with Vatanen and once with Kankkunen. In 2015 Peugeot again took part in the Rally Dakar with a newly constructed buggy. For the 2016 Paris-Dakar, Peugeot presented a new team of drivers including 9-time WRC-champion Sébastien Loeb and 12-time Dakar winner Stéphane Peterhansel who managed to win the 2016 edition for the Peugeot factory team in the Peugeot 2008 DKR. The 2017 edition saw Peugeot make the switch to the new 3008 DKR where Peterhansel won the event for the 13th time in a row. On 31 October 2017, Peugeot announced that it would end its program in the Dakar Rally after the 2018 edition in order to focus on its FIA World Rallycross Championship career. The 2018 event would see Peugeot win for the seventh straight time with ex-World Rally Championship driver Carlos Sainz.

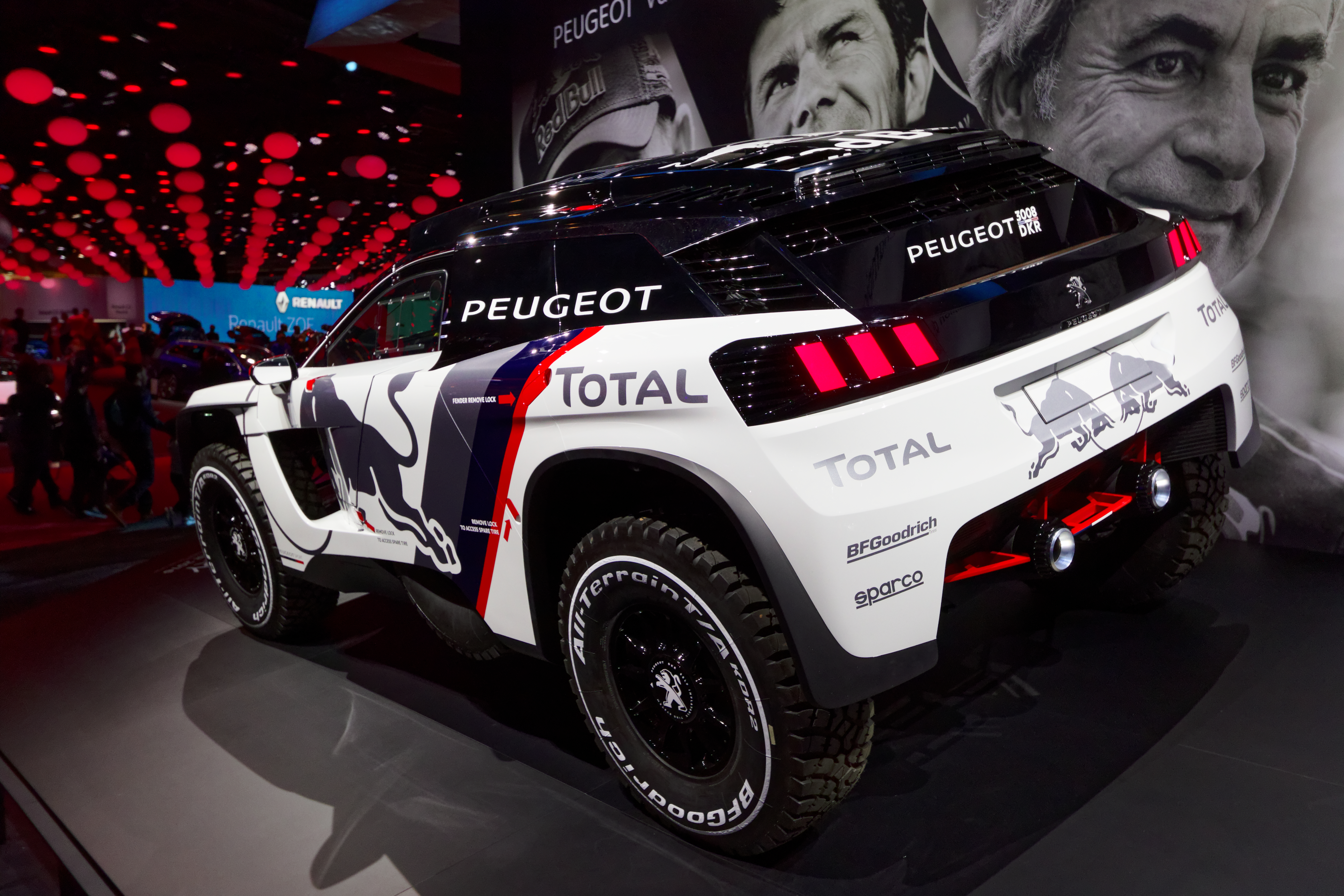
Peugeot 3008 DKR, 2017 winner of the Dakar Rally

In 1999, Peugeot returned to the World Rally Championship with the 206 WRC. The car was immediately competitive against such opposition as the Subaru Impreza WRC, the Ford Focus WRC, and the Mitsubishi Lancer Evolution. Marcus Grönholm gave the car its first win at the 2000 Swedish Rally, and Peugeot went on to win the manufacturers' title in their first full year since the return, and Grönholm the drivers' title in his first full WRC season. After successfully but narrowly defending their manufacturers' title in 2001, Peugeot Sport dominated the 2002 season, taking eight wins in the hands of Grönholm and Gilles Panizzi. Grönholm also took the drivers' title. For the 2004 season, Peugeot retired the 206 WRC in favour of the new 307 WRC. The 307 WRC did not match its predecessor in success, but Grönholm took three wins with the car, one in 2004 and two in 2005. PSA Peugeot Citroën withdrew Peugeot from the WRC after the 2005 season, while Citroën took a sabbatical year in 2006 and returned for the next season. Meanwhile, Gronholm departed Peugeot when they quit at the end of 2005 to partner young compatriot Mikko Hirvonen at Ford.

Peugeot 207 S2000, winner of the Intercontinental Rally Challenge from 2007 to 2009.

=== Touring car racing ===
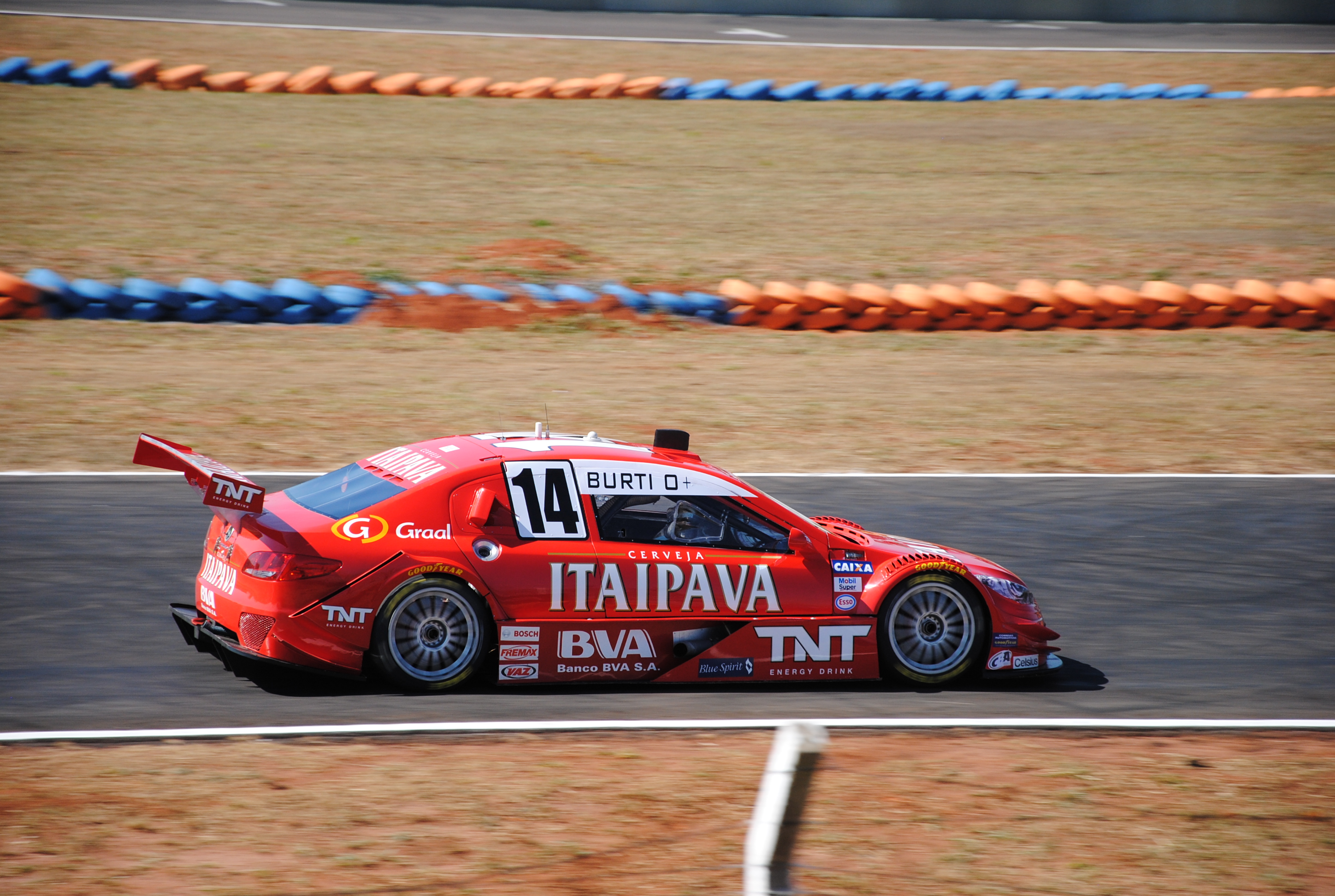
In 2009 and 2011, Peugeot won the Stock Car V8 championship with Cacá Bueno (here Luciano Burti).

In 2013, the Peugeot 208GTi won a one-two-three at the 24 Hours Nürburgring endurance race.

The Peugeot 306 GTi won the prestigious Spa 24 hours endurance race in 1999 and 2000.

Peugeot has been racing successfully in the Asian Touring Car Series, winning the 2000, 2001, and 2002 championships with the Peugeot 306 GTi.

Peugeot has been racing successfully in the Stock Car Brasil series since 2007 and won the 2008, 2009, and 2011 championships.

Peugeot won five times the Danish Touringcar Championship, with both the Peugeot 306 -winner in 1999, 2000, and 2001- and the Peugeot 307 winner in 2002 and 2003.

With his Peugeot 406, Laurent Aiello won the 1997 Super Tourenwagen Cup season.

Throughout the mid-1990s, the Peugeot 406 saloon (called a sedan in some countries) contested touring car championships across the world, enjoying success in France, Germany and Australia, yet failing to win a single race in the British Touring Car Championship despite a number of podium finishes under the command of 1992 British Touring Car Champion Tim Harvey. In Gran Turismo 2 the 406 saloon description sums its racing career up as "a competitive touring car which raced throughout Europe".

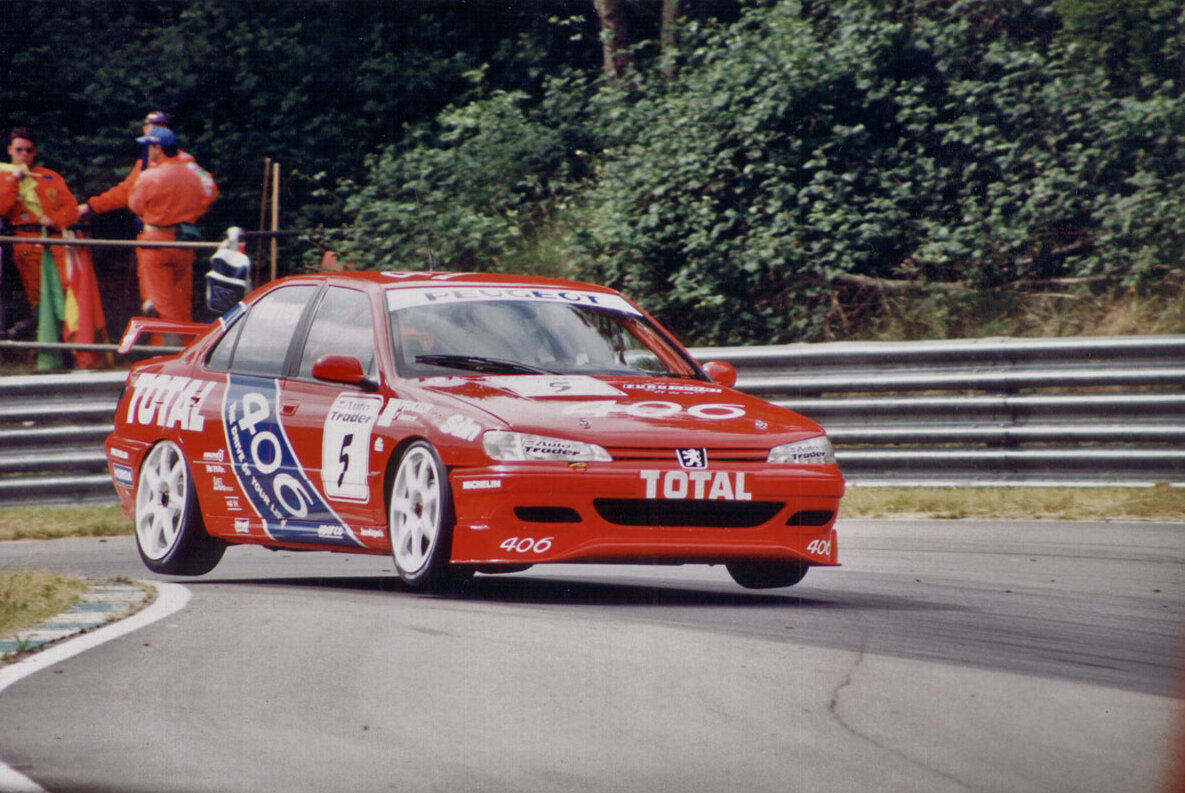
Tim Harvey in a 406 during the 1996 BTCC season

The British cars were initially prepared by Peugeot Sport; a team from the Peugeot UK factory in Coventry under the direction of team manager Mick Linford in 1996, with Total sponsorship. Peugeot Sport was not however a full professional race team akin to those of the competition, by now including Williams, Prodrive, Schnitzer and TWR; being as it was run from workshops within the Peugeot factory, largely by factory employees from 1992 to 1996, racing the 405 Mi16 from 1992 to 1995. Peugeot, therefore, contracted Motor Sport Development (MSD; who had developed and run the Honda Accord in the BTCC from 1995 to 1996) to build & run the 406 for 1997–98, when they wore a distinctive green and gold-flame design in deference to new sponsor Esso.

Initially, the 406's lack of success was blamed on suspension problems. During 1998 the 406 apparently lacked sufficient horsepower to compete with the front runners' Nissan Primeras and Honda Accords; this was mentioned during a particularly strong showing from Harvey's 406 at the Oulton Park BTCC meeting of 1998 when motorsport commentator Charlie Cox stated: "some people say (the 406) is down on power – you're kidding". During the first BTCC meeting at Silverstone in the same year, Cox mentions that MSD re-designed the 406 touring car "from the ground up". It was however widely reported in publications like the now-defunct 'Super Touring' magazine that it was the aero package primarily developed for longer, faster tracks in Germany and France that led to its success there but hindered the 406 on the slower, twistier tracks of the UK.

In 2001, Peugeot entered three BTC-T Peugeot 406 Coupés into the British Touring Car Championship to compete with the dominant Vauxhall Astra coupes. The 406 coupe was at the end of its product lifecycle and was not competitive, despite some promise towards the end of the year, notably when Peugeot's Steve Soper led a race only to suffer engine failure in the last few laps. The 406 coupes were retired at the end of the following year and replaced with the Peugeot 307—again, uncompetitively in 2003. Alongside the BTC-C 406's; two works-supported 306 GTis were also raced in the BTC-P (Production) class by Simon Harrison and Roger Moen, with Harrison emerging class champion.

=== Sports car racing ===
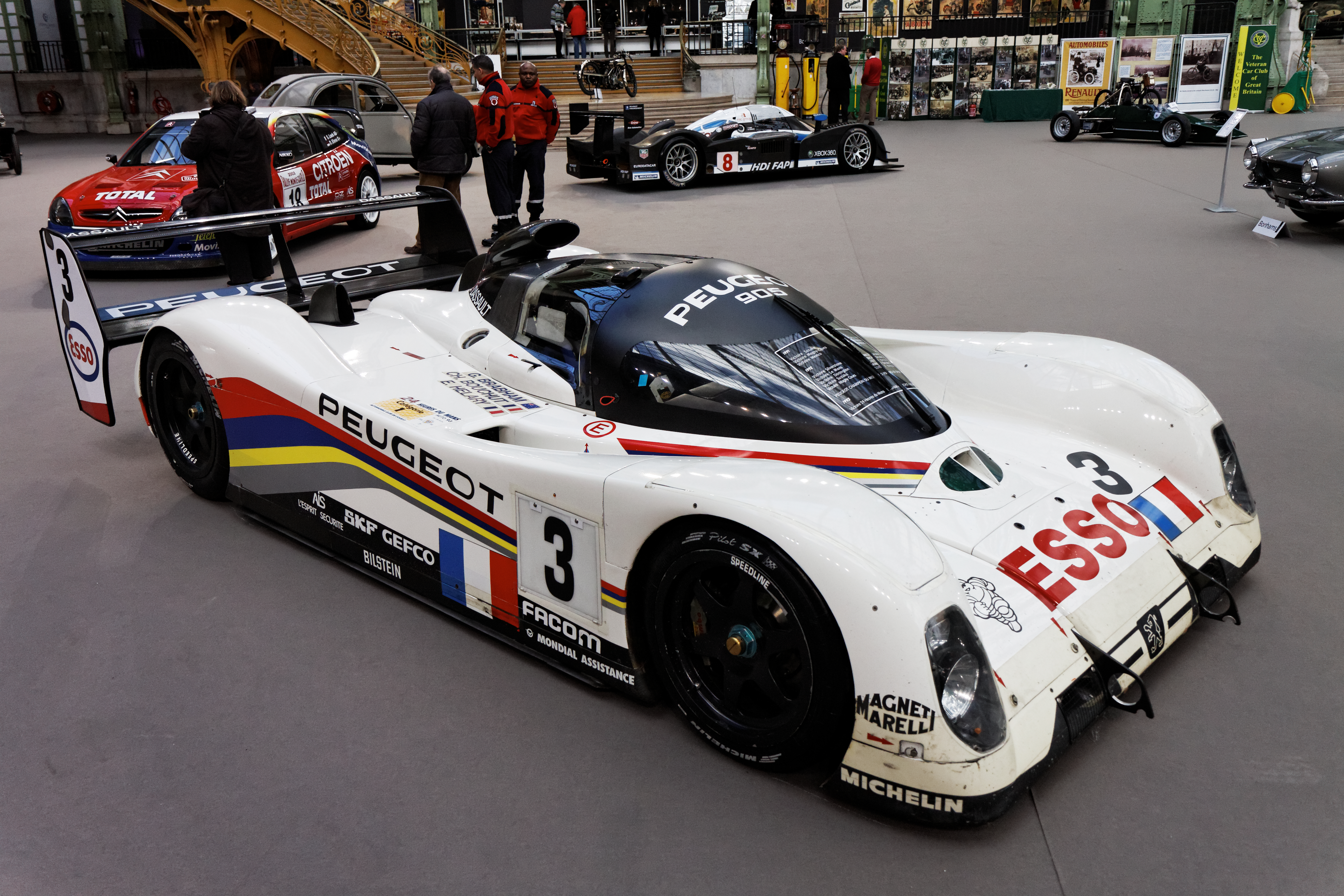
Peugeot 905, 1992 and 1993 winner of 24 Hours of Le Mans

In the 1990s, the company competed in endurance racing, including the World Sportscar Championship and the 24 Hours of Le Mans race with the 905. The sportscar team was established at Vélizy-Villacoublay, France. After early problems with reliability and aerodynamics, the 905 was successful in the World Sportscar Championship, winning eight of the 14 races across the 1991 and 1992 seasons and winning the team and driver titles in 1992. Peugeot also won the 24 Hours of Le Mans in 1992 and 1993.

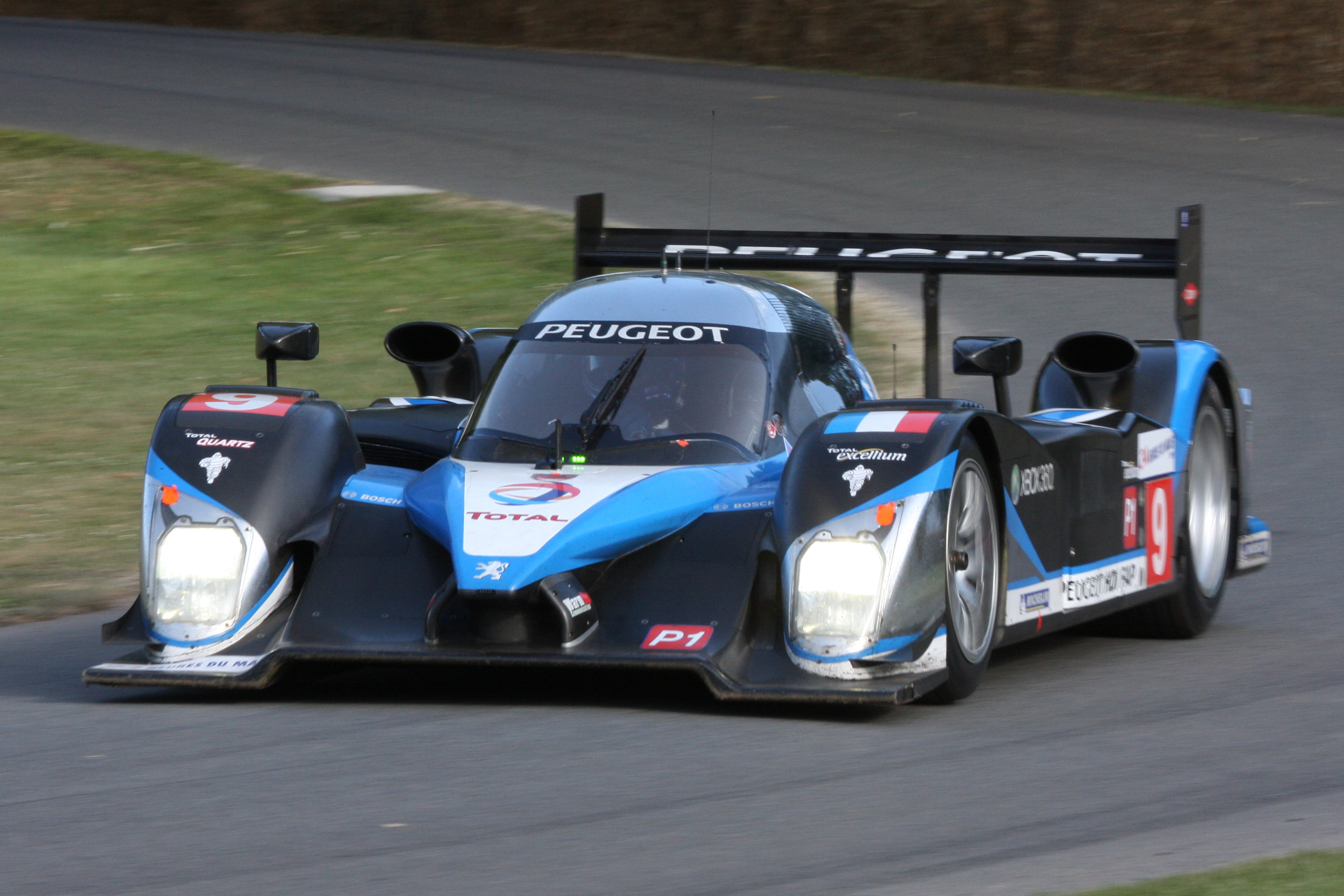
Peugeot 908, 2009 winner of 24 Hours of Le Mans

Peugeot returned to sportscar racing and Le Mans in 2007 with the diesel-powered Peugeot 908 HDi FAP. At the 2007 24 Hours of Le Mans, Stéphane Sarrazin secured pole position but the 908s proved unreliable and ceded victory to Audi. In 2008, Sarrazin earned a pole position but Audi prevailed once again. For the 2009 24 Hours of Le Mans, the Peugeot 908 HDi FAPs finished first and second overall, led by drivers Marc Gené, David Brabham, and Alexander Wurz.

=== Formula One ===
Peugeot as a Formula One engine manufacturer
- Base: Vélizy-Villacoublay, Île-de-France, France
- Notable staff: Jean-Pierre Jabouille; Jean-Pierre Boudy

Formula One World Championship career
- First entry: 1994 Brazilian Grand Prix
- Last entry: 2000 Malaysian Grand Prix
- Races entered: 115
- Chassis: McLaren, Jordan, Prost
- Constructors' Championships: 0
- Drivers' Championships: 0
- Race victories: 0
- Podiums: 14
- Points: 128
- Pole positions: 0
- Fastest laps: 1

The company has also been involved in providing engines to Formula One teams, notably to McLaren in 1994, to Jordan for the 1995, 1996 and 1997 seasons, and to Prost for the 1998, 1999 and 2000 seasons. Despite a number of podium finishes with each of these three teams, the manufacturer did not score any victories, and its F1 interests were sold to Asiatech at the end of the 2000 season.

=== Pikes Peak Hillclimb ===
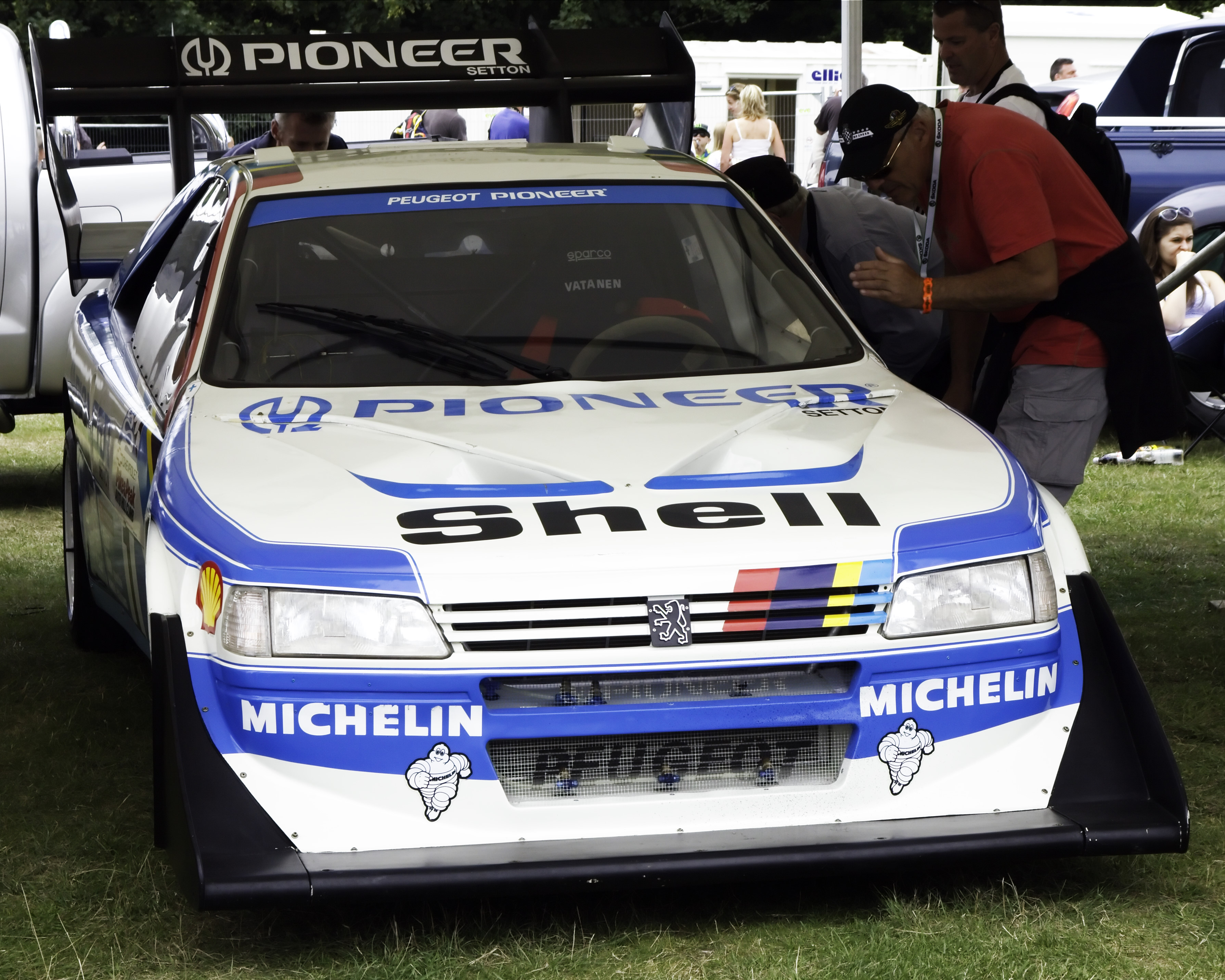
Ari Vatanen's Pikes Peak Peugeot 405

In April 2013, a 208 T16 was tested by Sébastien Loeb at Mont Ventoux. Loosely based on the shape and design of the production 208, the T16 is a lightweight 875 kg (1,929 lb) vehicle that uses the rear wing from the Peugeot 908, and has a 3.2-litre, twin-turbo V6 engine, developing 875 bhp (652 kW; 887 PS) with the aim of competing at the Pikes Peak International Hill Climb. 30 June 2013 saw this car demolish the standing record on Pikes Peak by over a minute and a half, with an overall time of 8:13.878.

== Concept cars ==
- Quasar (1984)
- Proxima (1986)
- Oxia (1988)
- Ion (1994)
- Touareg (1996)
- Asphalte (1996)
- 806 Runabout (1997)
- 206 (1998)
- Escapade (1998)
- Les City Toyz (2000)
- Peugeot 607 Feline (2000)
- Peugeot 607 Paladine (2000)
- Peugeot Sésame (2002)
- 607 Pescarolo (2002)
- 307 CC (2002)
- Peugeot H2O (2002)
- Peugeot RC (2002)
- Peugeot Hoggar (2003)
- Peugeot 407 Elixir (2003)
- Peugeot 4002 (2003)
- 407 Silhouette (2004)
- Peugeot Quark (2004)
- Peugeot 907 (2004)
- Peugeot Coupé 407 Prologue (2005)
- Peugeot 20Cup (2005)
- Peugeot 908 RC (2006)
- Spider 207 (2006)
- Peugeot RC HYbrid4 HYmotion4 (2008)
- Peugeot RD (2008)
- Peugeot BB1 (2009)
- Peugeot EX1 Concept (2010)
- Peugeot HR1 (2010)
- Peugeot SR1 (2010)
- Peugeot 5 by Peugeot (2010)
- Peugeot HX1 (2011)
- Peugeot SXC (2011)
- Peugeot Onyx (2012)
- Peugeot Exalt (2014)
- Peugeot Quartz (2014)
- Peugeot Fractal (2015)
- Peugeot Instinct (2017)
- Peugeot e-Legend (2018)
- Peugeot Inception (2023)

In the 2017 film Blade Runner 2049, the main character's flying car (known in-universe as a "Spinner") was branded as a Peugeot as part of a proposed advertising campaign to re-enter the US market. The film's production company, Alcon Entertainment, later sued Peugeot in 2019 for failure to hold up its financial and advertising obligations.

== Peugeot Avenue flagship dealerships ==
Peugeot has flagship dealerships, named Peugeot Avenue, located on the Champs-Élysées in Paris, and in Berlin. The Berlin showroom is larger than the Paris one, but both feature regularly changing mini-exhibitions displaying production and concept cars. Both also feature a small Peugeot Boutique, and they are popular places for Peugeot fans to visit. Peugeot Avenue Berlin also features a café, called Café de France. The Peugeot Avenue at Berlin closed in 2009.

== Motorcycles ==
The Peugeot Motocycles company remained a major producer of scooters, underbones, mopeds, and bicycles in Europe, as of 2018. Peugeot produced an electric motor scooter, the Peugeot Scoot'Elec, from 1996 to 2006, and was projected to re-enter the market in 2011 with the E-Vivacity.

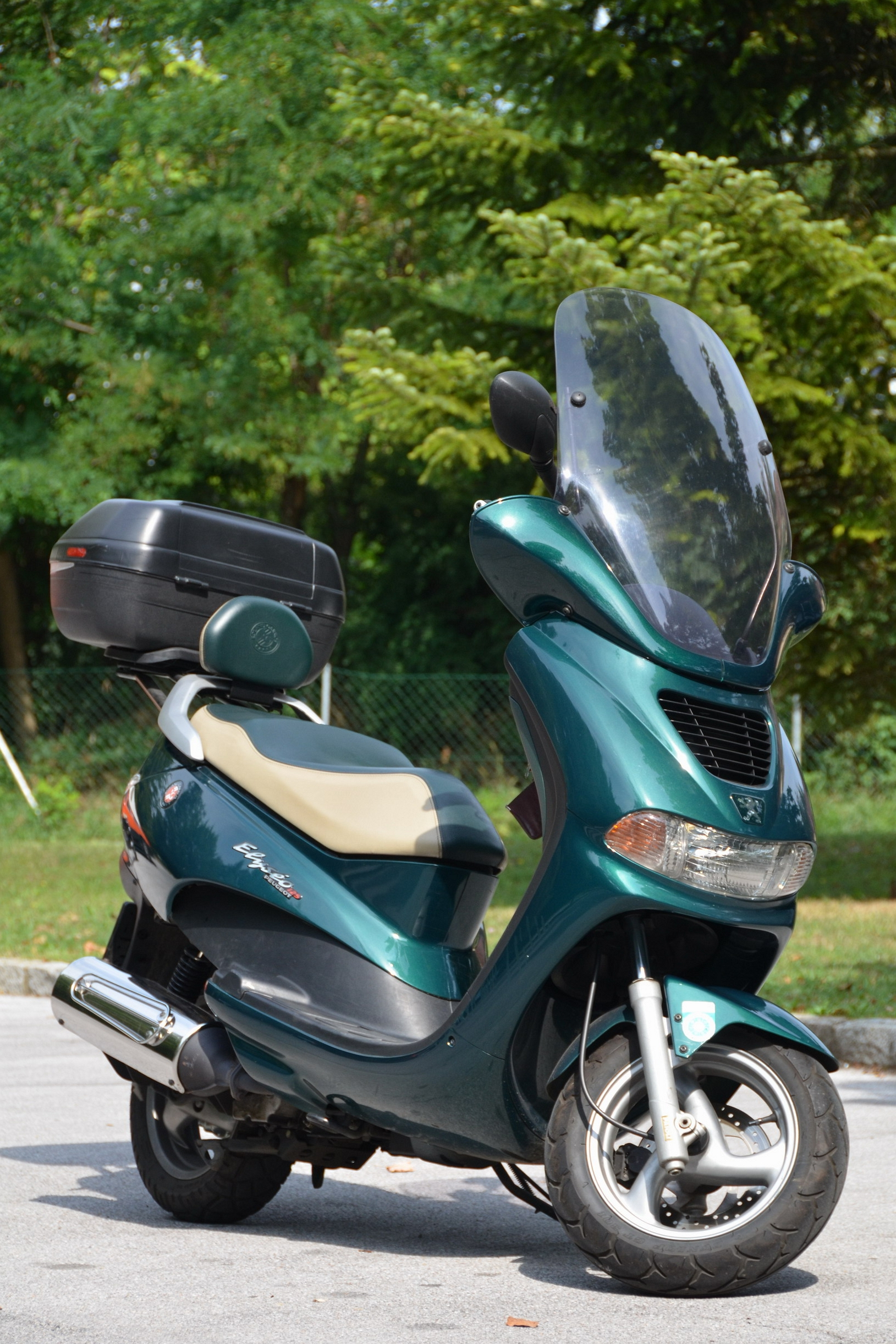
Peugeot Elyséo 125, 'Roland Garros', 2002

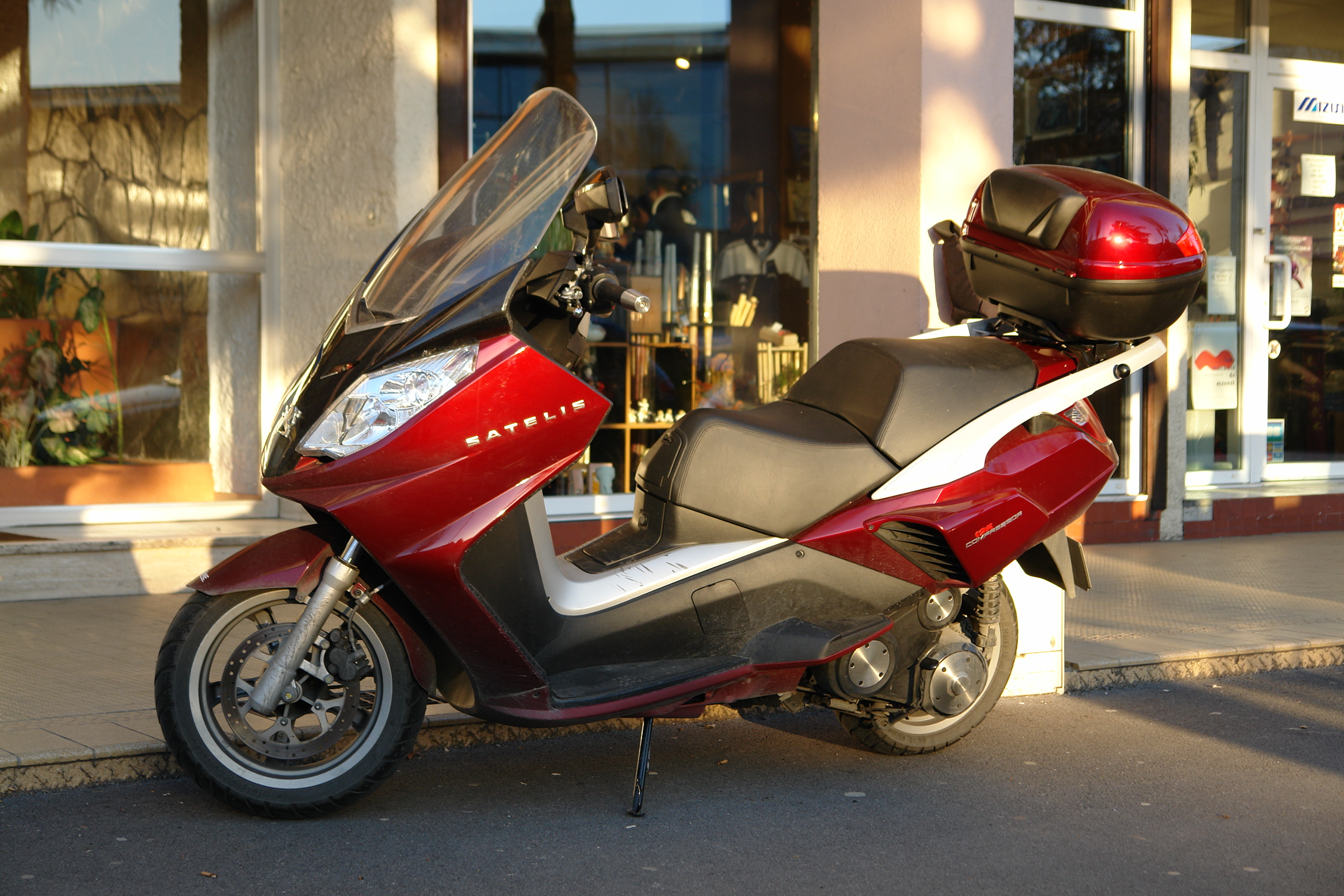
Peugeot Satelis 125

== Bicycles ==
Peugeot also produced bicycles starting in 1882 in Beaulieu, France (with ten Tour de France wins between 1903 and 1983), followed by motorcycles and cars in 1889. In the late 1980s Peugeot sold the North American rights to the Peugeot bicycle name to ProCycle, a Canadian company which also sold bicycles under the CCM and Velo Sport names. The European rights were briefly sold to Cycleurope S.A., returning to Peugeot in the 1990s. Today, the Peugeot bicycle brand name remains within the Cycleurope S.A. portfolio.

== Kitchen- and table-service equipment ==
As of 2021, the separate Peugeot-family-owned firm Peugeot Saveurs, previously named PSP Peugeot, continues to make and market pepper grinders, salt grinders, corkscrews for wine bottles, cutlery, tableware, and other kitchen- and table-service equipment.

The company has produced household mills since the 19th century. Its first coffee mill, the R model, was launched in 1840, followed by large cast-iron grocers’ mills in 1855. Peugeot introduced the Z model table pepper mill in 1874, which remains in production. In the early 21st century, the firm developed patented mechanisms tailored to different spices, including a chilli pre-chopper and a grinder for moist Guérande salt (2003), the adjustable “u’Select” grind system (2004), and a ceramic mechanism to process wet sea salt without clogging (2014).

The product range has expanded to include coffee grinders, nutmeg mills, chilli grinders, and spice mills for seeds such as flax or sesame, as well as wine accessories such as corkscrews, decanters, champagne coolers, and vacuum pumps. Peugeot Saveurs also manufactures glazed ceramic ovenware under the “Appolia” brand line.

Production remains centered in Quingey, in the Franche-Comté region of France, where most of its mills are manufactured. The firm has been awarded the French Entreprise du Patrimoine Vivant (Living Heritage Company) label in recognition of its traditional expertise. Peugeot Saveurs reports annual production of more than two million mills and exports to over 80 countries. The company employs around 185 people, most of them at the Quingey facility. Its grinding mechanisms are typically covered by a lifetime guarantee, while the mill bodies carry multi-year warranties.

== See also ==
- List of automobile manufacturers of France
- French bicycle industry
- List of automobile manufacturers
- List of companies of France
- Peugeot Concours Design
