= Hydrogen technologies =

Technologies that relating to the production & use of hydrogen

Hydrogen technologies are technologies that relate to the production and use of hydrogen as a part hydrogen economy. Hydrogen technologies are applicable for many uses.

Some hydrogen technologies are carbon neutral and could have a role in preventing climate change and a possible future hydrogen economy. Hydrogen is a chemical widely used in various applications including ammonia production, oil refining and energy. The most common methods for producing hydrogen on an industrial scale are: Steam reforming, oil reforming, coal gasification, water electrolysis.

Hydrogen is not a primary energy source, because it is not naturally occurring as a fuel. It is, however, widely regarded as an ideal energy storage medium, due to the ease with which electricity can convert water into hydrogen and oxygen through electrolysis and can be converted back to electrical power using a fuel cell or hydrogen turbine. There are a wide number of different types of fuel and electrolysis cells.

The potential environmental impact depends primarily on the methods used to generate hydrogen as a fuel.

== Fuel cells ==
- Alkaline fuel cell (AFC)
- Direct borohydride fuel cell (DBFC)
- Direct carbon fuel cell (DCFC)
- Direct ethanol fuel cell (DEFC)
- Direct methanol fuel cell (DMFC)
- Electro-galvanic fuel cell (EGFC)
- Flow battery (RFC)
- Formic acid fuel cell (FAFC)
- Metal hydride fuel cell (MHFC)
- Microbial fuel cell (MFC)
- Molten carbonate fuel cell (MCFC)
- Phosphoric acid fuel cell (PAFC)
- Photoelectrochemical cell (PEC)
- Proton-exchange membrane fuel cell (PEMFC)
- Protonic ceramic fuel cell (PCFC)
- Regenerative fuel cell (RFC)
- Solid oxide fuel cell (SOFC)

== Hydrogen infrastructure ==
- Hydrogen plant (Steam reformer)
- Hydrogen pipeline transport
- Hydrogen pressure letdown station
- Compressed hydrogen tube trailer
- Liquid hydrogen tank truck
- Hydrogen piping
- Hydrogen station
- HCNG
- Homefueler
- Home Energy Station
- Hydrogen highway
- Zero Regio
- Hydrogen compressor
- Electrochemical hydrogen compressor
- Guided rotor compressor
- Hydride compressor
- Ionic liquid piston compressor
- Linear compressor
- Hydrogen turboexpander-generator
- Hydrogen leak testing
- Hydrogen sensor
- Hydrogen purifier
- Hydrogen analyzer
- Hydrogen valve

=== Hydrogen storage ===
- Compressed hydrogen
- Cryo-adsorption
- Liquid hydrogen
- Slush hydrogen
- Underground hydrogen storage
- Hydrogen tank
- Power to gas

== Hydrogen vehicles ==
=== Historic hydrogen filled airships ===
- Hindenburg (airship)
- Zeppelin

=== Hydrogen powered cars ===
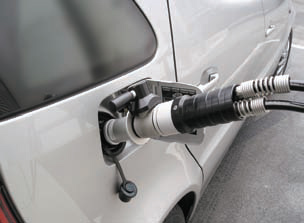
Hydrogen fueling nozzle

Audi:

- 2004 – Audi A2H2-hybrid vehicle
- 2009 – Audi Q5-FCEV

BMW:

- 2002 – BMW 750hl
- 2010 – BMW 1 Series Fuel-cell hybrid electric

Chrysler:

- 2000 – Jeep Commander II-hybrid vehicle-Commercial
- 2001 – Chrysler Natrium-hybrid vehicle
- 2003 – Jeep Treo-Fuel cell

Daimler:

- 1994 – Mercedes-Benz NECAR 1
- 1996 – Mercedes-Benz NECAR 2
- 1997 – Mercedes-Benz NECAR 3
- 1999 – Mercedes-Benz NECAR 4
- 2000 – Mercedes-Benz NECAR 5
- 2002 – Mercedes-Benz F-Cell based on the Mercedes-Benz A-Class
- 2005 – Mercedes-Benz F600 Hygenius
- 2009 – Mercedes-Benz F-CELL Roadster
- 2009 – Mercedes-Benz F-Cell based on the Mercedes-Benz B-Class

Fiat:

- 2001 – Fiat Seicento Elettra H2 Fuel Cell-hybrid vehicle
- 2003 – Fiat Seicento Hydrogen-hybrid vehicle
- 2005 – Fiat Panda Hydrogen-Fuel cell
- 2008 – Fiat Phyllis-Fuel cell
- 2008 – Fiat Panda-Fiat Panda HyTRAN

Ford:

- 2000 – Ford Focus FCV-Fuel cell. Note however that Ford Motor Company has dropped its plans to develop hydrogen cars, stating that "The next major step in Ford’s plan is to increase over time the volume of electrified vehicles".
- 2006 – F-250 Super Chief a Tri-Flex engine concept pickup.

Forze Hydrogen-Electric Racing Team Delft

- 2016 – Forze-Fuel cell

General Motors:

- 1966 – GM Electrovan-Fuel cell
- 2001 – HydroGen3-Fuel cell
- 2002 – GM HyWire-Fuel cell
- 2005 – GM Sequel-hybrid vehicle
- 2006 – Chevrolet Equinox Fuel Cell
- 2007 – HydroGen4

Honda:

- 2002 – Honda FCX – hybrid vehicle
- 2007 – Honda FCX Clarity – Hydrogen fuel cell – Production model

Hyundai:

- 2001 – Hyundai Santa Fe FCEV
- 2010 – Hyundai ix35 FCEV

Lotus Engineering:

- 2010 – Black Cab-Fuel cell

Kia:

- 2009 – Kia Borrego FCEV-Fuel cell

Mazda:

- 1991 – Mazda HR-X Hydrogen Wankel Rotary.
- 1993 – Mazda HR-X2 Hydrogen Wankel Rotary.
- 1993 – Mazda MX-5 Miata Hydrogen Wankel Rotary.
- 1995 – Mazda Capella Cargo, first public street test of the hydrogen Wankel Rotary engine.
- 1997 – Mazda Demio FC-EV Methanol-Reducing Fuel Cell
- 2001 – Mazda Premacy FC-EV – First public street test of the Methanol-Reducing Fuel Cell vehicle in Japan
- 2003 – Mazda RX-8 Hydrogen RE Hydrogen \ Gasoline hybrid Wankel Rotary.
- 2007 – Mazda Premacy Hydrogen RE Hybrid
- 2009 – Mazda 5 Hydrogen RE Hybrid

Mitsubishi:

- 2004 – Mitsubishi FCV

Morgan:

- 2005 – Morgan LIFEcar-hybrid vehicle-concept car

Nissan:

- 2002 – Nissan X-Trail FCHV-hybrid vehicle. Note, however that in 2009, Nissan announced that it is cancelling its hydrogen car R&D efforts.

Peugeot:

- 2004 – Peugeot Quark
- 2006 – Peugeot 207 Epure
- 2008 – H2Origin-Fuel cell

Renault:

- Scenic ZEV H2 is a hydro-electric MPV co-developed by Nissan.

Riversimple:

- 2009 – Riversimple Urban Car

Ronn Motor Company:

- 2008 – Ronn Motor Scorpion

Toyota:

- 2002 – Toyota FCHV-hybrid vehicle
- 2003 – Toyota Fine-S-concept car
- 2003 – Toyota Fine-N-concept car
- 2005 – Toyota Fine-T-concept car
- 2005 – Toyota Fine-X-concept car
- 2008 – Toyota FCHV-adv-preproduction vehicle (expected public release 2015)

Volkswagen:

- 2000 – VW Bora Hy-motion-Fuel cell
- 2002 – VW Bora Hy-power-Fuel cell
- 2004 – VW Touran Hy-motion-Fuel cell
- 2007 – VW space up! blue

=== Hydrogen-powered planes ===
- Hyfish
- Smartfish
- Tupolev Tu-155-hydrogen-powered version of Tu-154
- Antares DLR-H2 -The first aircraft capable of performing a complete flight on fuel-cell power only

Possible future aircraft using precooled jet engines include Reaction Engines Skylon and the Reaction Engines A2.

=== Hydrogen powered rockets ===
The following rockets were/are partially or completely propelled by hydrogen fuel:

- Saturn V (upper stage)
- Space Shuttle
- Ariane 5
- Delta IV
- Atlas V (Centaur upper stage)
- CE-20 (cryogenic rocket engine for upper stage of GSLV-III)

== Related technologies ==
=== Environmental ===
- Anaerobic digestion
- Dark fermentation
- Photofermentation
- Syngas

=== Nuclear ===
- Generation IV reactor
- Hydrogen bomb

=== Organic chemistry ===
- Dehydrogenation
- Hydrogenation
- Hydrogenolysis

== Miscellaneous ==
- Hydrogen therapy
- Hydrogen odorant
- Atomic hydrogen welding
- Hydrogen-cooled turbo generator
- Oxyhydrogen flame
- Low hydrogen annealing
- Hydrogen decrepitation process (HD)
- Hydrogenation disproportionation desorption and recombination (HDDR)
- Standard hydrogen electrode
- Reversible hydrogen electrode
- Dynamic hydrogen electrode
- Palladium–hydrogen electrode
- Cathodic protection
- Iron-hydrogen resistor
- Hydrogen pinch
- Hofmann voltameter
- Hydrox
- Hydreliox
- Joule–Thomson effect
- Hydrogen ion
- Bussard ramjet
- Döbereiner's lamp
- Nickel–hydrogen battery
- Gas-absorption refrigerator
- Electroosmotic pump
- Sodium silicide
- Temperature-programmed reduction
- Hydrogen damage
- Hydrogen embrittlement

== See also ==
- National Center for Hydrogen Technology
- Hydrogen economy § Color codes
- Methane pyrolysis
- Laura Maersk (2023) – first methanol container ship
