= Peugeot 907 =

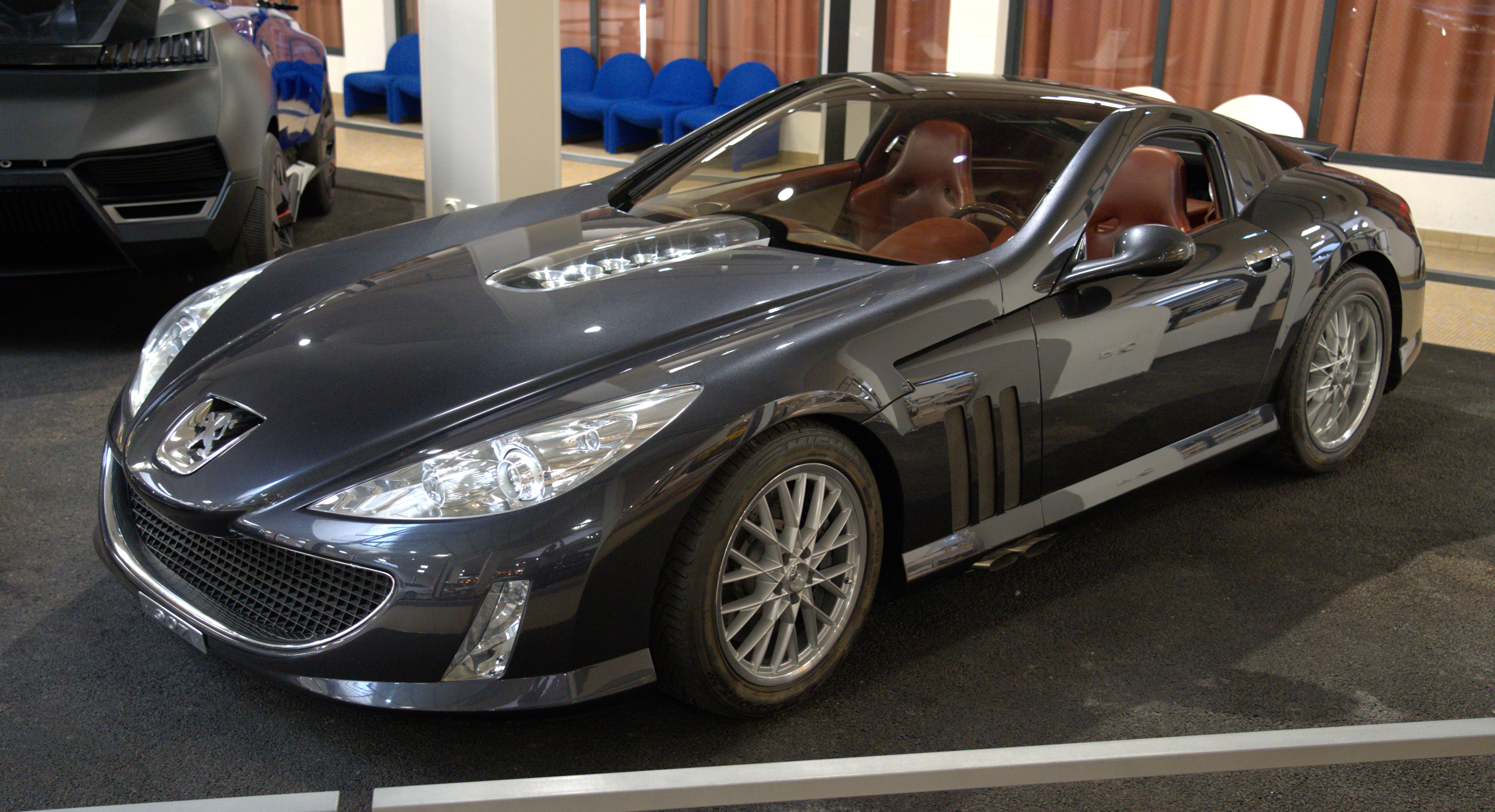
- Peugeot 907

Overview
- Manufacturer: Peugeot
- Production: 2004 (concept car)
- Designer: Gérard Welter; Jean Christophe Bolle Reddat

Body and chassis
- Class: Concept car
- Body style: 2-door coupé (2 seats)
- Layout: Front mid-engine, rear-wheel drive

Powertrain
- Engine: 6.0-litre PSA V12 (petrol) (based on the ES9 from the Peugeot 607)
- Transmission: 6-speed transaxle rear mounted automated manual (electronically controlled sequential)

Dimensions
- Wheelbase: 2,500 mm (98.4 in)
- Length: 4,370 mm (172.0 in)
- Width: 1,880 mm (74.0 in)
- Height: 1,210 mm (47.6 in)
- Kerb weight: 1,400 kg (3,086 lb)

The Peugeot 907 was a concept car built by Peugeot. Unveiled at the 2004 Paris Motor Show, the car was created by styling chief Gérard Welter and designer Jean Christophe Bolle Reddat to celebrate the closure of the firm’s 40-year-old design centre at La Garenne and the opening of the new centre at Vélizy.

It was one of three concepts cars unveiled by Peugeot at the show, alongside the Quark and 1007 RC. Fleet News described this concept as “Peugeot’s answer to Ferrari’s Maranello” prior to the car's reveal. The car was never designed to go into production, but was intended to be a prototype featuring the new design techniques by Peugeot.

The engine is mounted just behind the front wheels, and side exhausts exit behind each of the front wheels. Unlike many concepts, the 907 can be driven like any production car. Under the bonnet, two 3.0-litre V6 engines are combined to form a 500BHP V12.

The monocoque body is made of carbon fiber and the car uses a double wishbone suspension all round, while the sequential-shift transmission distributes power to the rear wheels. The arcing windscreen continues upwards to form the roof, while the bonnet has a see-through perspex insert that reveals the engine’s 12 intake trumpets.

== Specifications ==
- Engine: 6.0-litre, PSA V12 (based on the ES9 from the Peugeot 607)
- Transmission: six-speed transaxle rear-mounted automated manual
- Drivetrain: front mid-engine, rear-wheel drive
- Estimated top speed: 360 km/h (222 mph)
- 0–60 mph (97 km/h): 3.7 seconds (estimated)

== Gallery ==
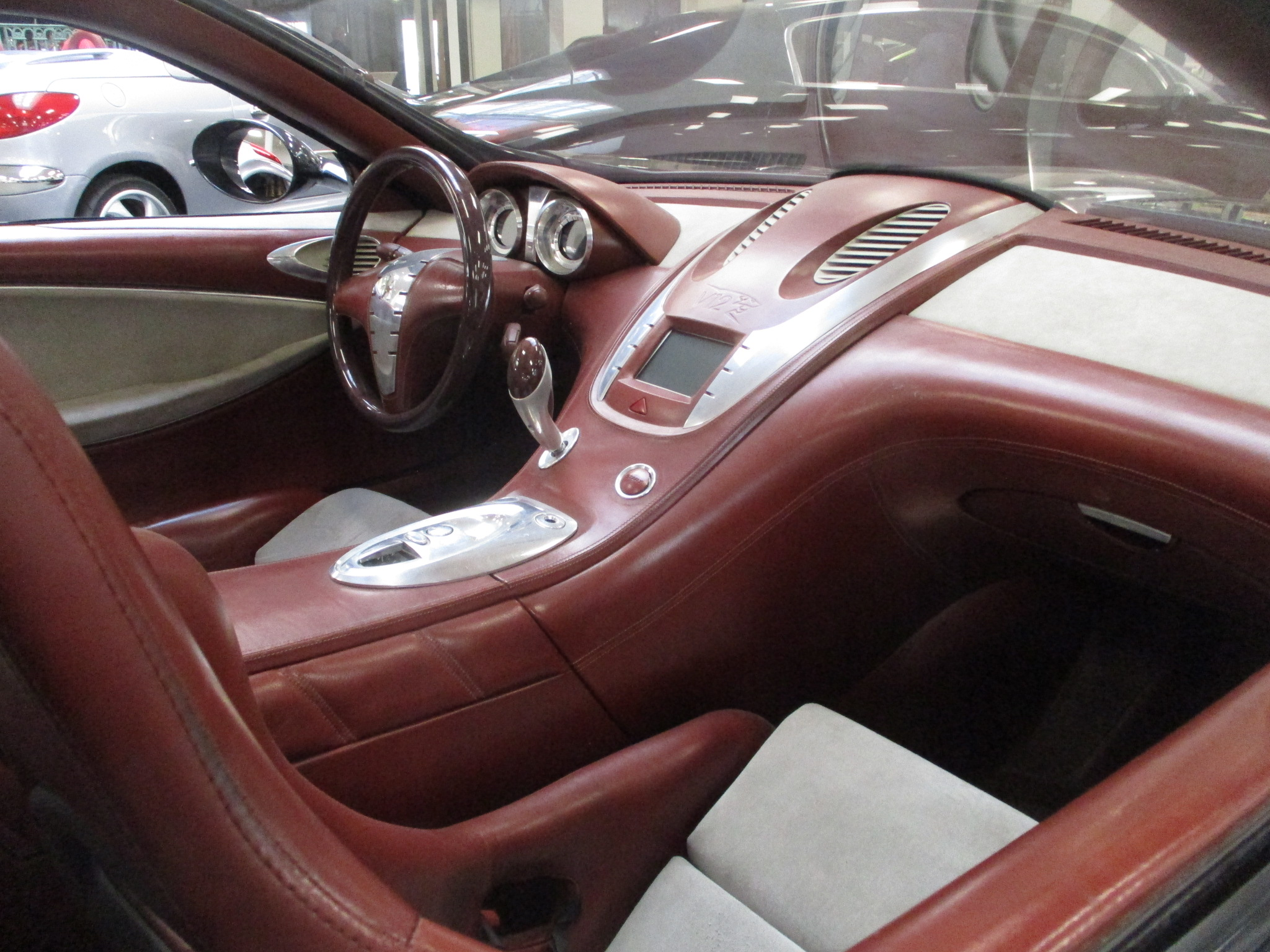
Interior

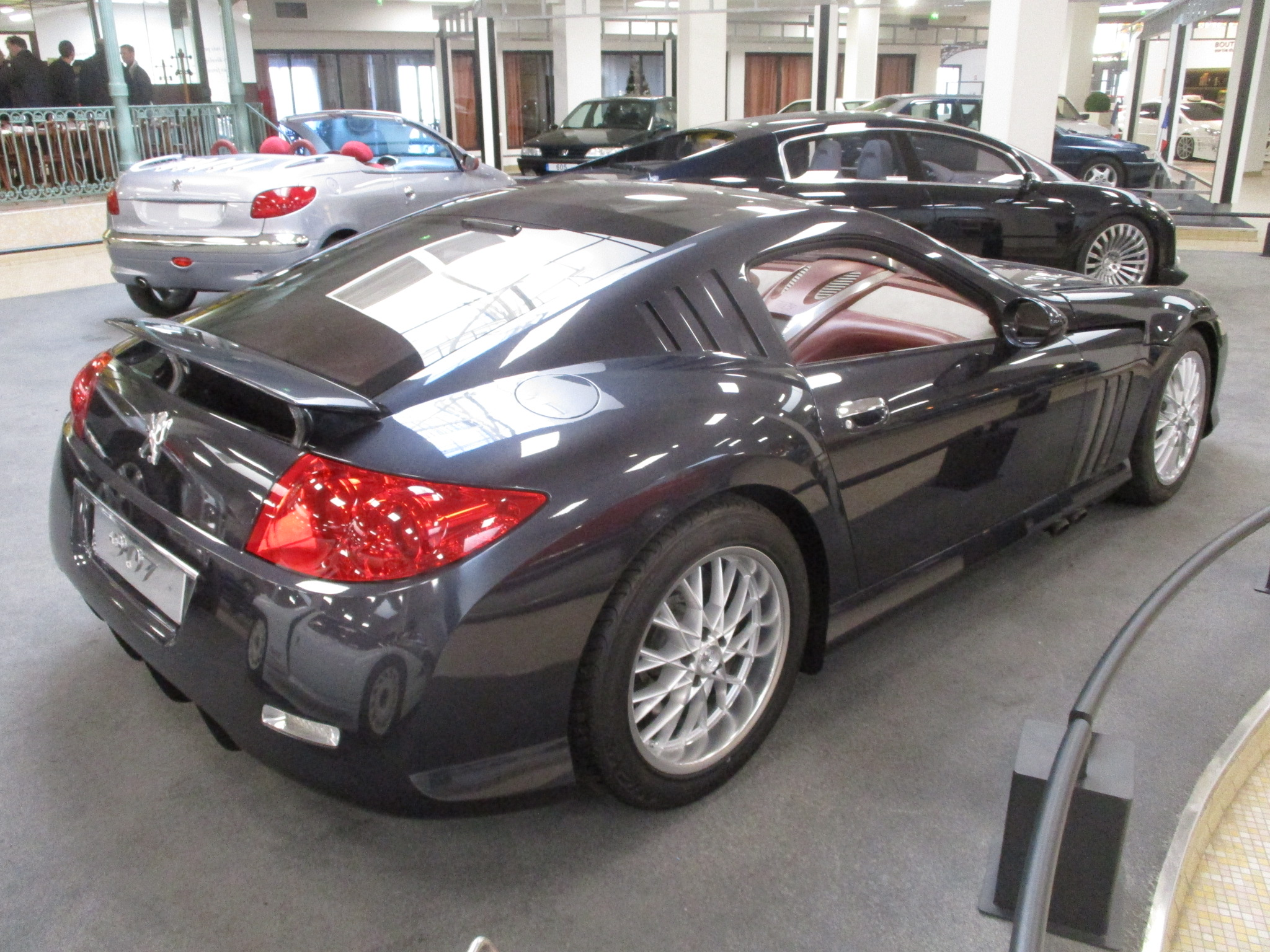
Rear view
