= Michelin Challenge Bibendum =

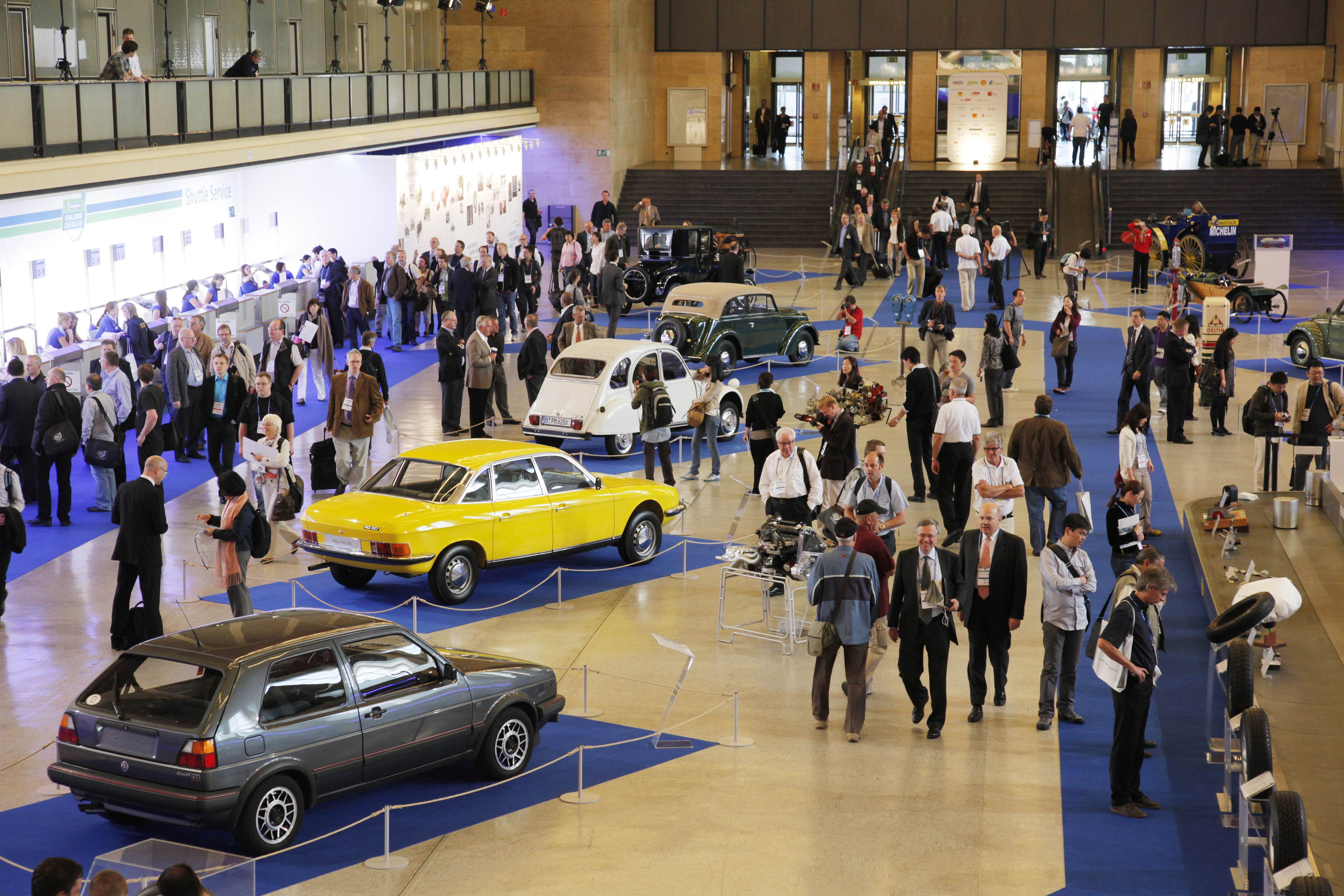
Michelin Challenge Bibendum (Berlin, Germany 2011)

Movin'On Summit (since 2017), formerly called Michelin Challenge Bibendum, is a major annual sustainable mobility event, organized by the Movin'On Sustainable Mobility Fund, created and inspired by the French tire company Michelin. In December 2008, Michelin announced that it was postponing the 2009 Michelin Challenge Bibendum event—scheduled for April 2009 in Rio de Janeiro, Brazil—until 2010, due to the economic crisis. That event ran from 30 May through 2 June 2010. In 2017, 2018 and 2019, the event took place in Montreal, Canada.

== History ==
In 1998, executives at Michelin made the decision to host an event that would showcase technological research into "clean vehicles" and allow them to be assessed in real operating conditions.

"Bibendum" is the name used in France for the iconic figure known in English language countries simply as "The Michelin Man".

In June 2017, Michelin Challenge Bibendum has become Movin'On. The first edition was held in Montreal, Quebec, Canada and federates the worlds of mobility and innovation, public authorities and NGOs. The 2018, 2019 and 2020 sessions took place in Montreal.

=== 2004 ===
From 12 to 14 October, over 106 companies attended the event, with 40% coming from China. Approximately 140 vehicles were registered, ranging from passenger cars to electric bicycles and buses. Notable vehicles included the hybrid Volkswagen "Sun Diesel" Golf IV, Ford Escape Hybrid, Opel Zafira Hydrogen 3, Nissan X-Trail Fuel Cell Vehicle, Peugeot Quark and the Audi A8 TDI.

The Volkswagen Mark 4 (Type 1J) was shown at the Michelin Challenge Bibendum in Shanghai. It was a diesel-electric hybrid called the Golf ECO.Power, which had a 76 kW 1.4L three-cylinder diesel engine with a 15 kW electric engine. The car attained a fuel consumption as low as 3.8L per 100 km (62 miles per gallon).

=== 2006 ===
In the Michelin Challenge Bibendum 2006, the ZENN received the highest overall rank in the Urban Car category. Various products and concepts were on display, ranging from new hybrid electric vehicles to next-generation fuel cell vehicles. Major auto manufacturers such as General Motors, Volvo, Peugeot and Nissan were present.

The Peugeot 307 CC Hybride HDi generated a lot of interest. It was a diesel-electric 2-door-cabriolet hybrid version of the 307 that can achieve 80 miles per gallon. The vehicle was in the concept stages. In addition, a diesel-electric hybrid, unlike petrol-electric vehicles, could be totally independent of oil since pure biodiesel can be used in any diesel engine.

=== 2007 ===
A Concept Logan "Renault eco²" and a prototype of the Volvo C30 diesel electric hybrid were scheduled to make an appearance.

== Locations ==
The location of the event changes every year.

- 2019 Montreal, Quebec
- 2017 Montreal, Canada
- 2014 Chengdu, China
- 2011 Berlin, Germany (18–22 May 2011)
- 2010 Rio de Janeiro, Brazil
- 2007 Shanghai, China
- 2006 Paris, France
- 2005 Kyoto, Japan
- 2004 Shanghai, China
- 2003 Sonoma, California
- 2002 Heidelberg, Germany
- 2001 Fontana, California
- 2000 Clermont-Ferrand, France
- 1998 Clermont-Ferrand, France

== See also ==
- List of hybrid vehicles
