= Elazar Gutmanas =

- אלעזר גוטמנאס
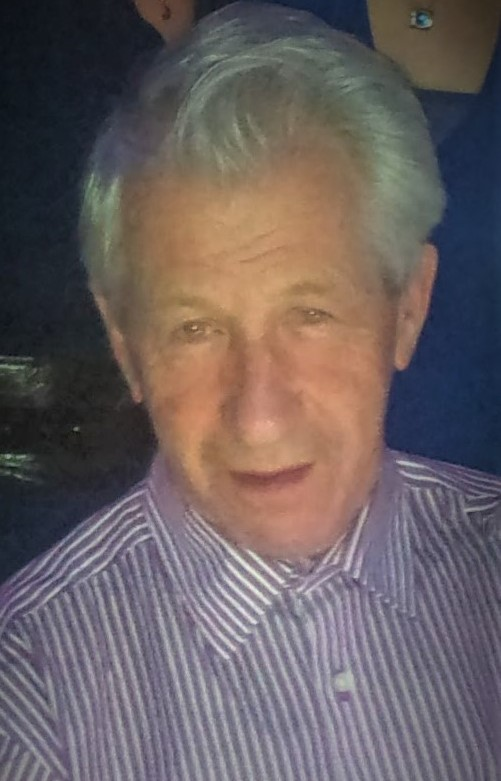
- Born: 28 October 1939; Kaunas, Lithuania
- Died: 26 October 2019 (aged 79); Rambam Health Care Campus, Haifa, Israel
- Resting place: Sde Yehoshua Jewish Cemetery (Kfar Samir)
- Citizenship: Israeli
- Education: Technion – Israel Institute of Technology
- Children: 3
- Scientific career
- Fields: Solid-state chemistry, Materials science
- Workplaces: Technion – Israel Institute of Technology

Elazar Gutmanas (Hebrew: אלעזר גוטמנאס; October 28, 1939 - October 26, 2019) was an Israeli physicist, material scientist and professor emeritus at the Faculty of Materials Science and Engineering at the Technion – Israel Institute of Technology.

== Biography ==
Gutmanas was born on 28 October 1939 in Kaunas, Lithuania, to a Jewish family. His father was a journalist, translator, and English teacher, and his mother was a physics lecturer at a university and at a technological Institute in Vilnius.

On June 24, 1941, during the German occupation of Lithuania in World War II, Gutmanas family boarded the last train to leave the city, and they moved to Kazakhstan, Soviet Union.

In 1962, Gutmanas graduated from the Leningrad Polytechnic Institute (now Peter the Great St. Petersburg Polytechnic University, SPbPU) and in 1970 he received his PhD from the Russian Institute of Solid State Physics (ISSP).

In 1973, Gutmanas immigrated to Israel with his family, and a year later, he joined the Department of Materials Engineering at the Technion. He remained there for the rest of his academic career.

During his years at the Technion, Gutmanas supervised graduating students, published more than one hundred articles in academic journals, and participated in numerous international conferences. Gutmanas served as a visiting scientist at the Max Planck Institute for Solid State Research (MPI-FKF). In 1994, he was appointed as a professor at the Technion Institute.

== Death ==
On 13 October 2019, Gutmanas worked with hydrogen at his laboratory on the Technion Institute. Following a hydrogen leak at the place, an explosion occurred, and Elazar was critically injured. He was evacuated to Rambam Health Care Campus in Haifa where he succumbed to his injuries 13 days later on 26 October 2019.

== Work ==
Gutmanas contributed to the field of hard protective coatings through his invention of the powder immersion reaction-assisted coating (PIRAC) method. He also attempted to find new approaches for self-propagating high-temperature synthesis (SHS).

== Publications ==
- V. Bobrov, E. Gutmanas, "Kinetics of Plastic Deformation at Superconducting Transitions", Phys. Status Solidi54b, 413-424 (1972).
- E. Y. Gutmanas, N. Travitzky, P. Haasen, "Negative and Positive Photoplastic Effect in CdTe", Phys. Status Solidi51a, 435-444 (1979).
- E.Y. Gutmanas, "Materials with Fine Microstructures by Advanced Powder Metallurgy", Progress in Materials Science 34, 261-366 (1990).
- E. Levin, E.Y. Gutmanas. Solid-state bonding of diamond to Nichrome and Co-20 wt% W alloys. Journal of Materials Science Letters 9 (1990) 726–730
- P. Mogilevsky, E.Y. Gutmanas, "On Thermodynamics of First Phase Formation during Interfacial Reactions", Mater. Sci. Eng. A221, 76-84 (1996).
- E.Y. Gutmanas, "Cold-Sintering - High Pressure Consolidation", ASM International, Materials Park, OH, pp. 574–582 (1998).
- E.Y. Gutmanas, I. Gotman, "Dense High-Temperature Ceramics by Thermal Explosion under Pressure", J. Eur. Ceram. Soc. 19, 2381-2393 (1999).
- E.Y. Gutmanas, I. Gotman, "PIRAC Ti Nitride coated Ti-6Al-4V Head against UHMWPE Acetabular Cup - Hip Wear Simulator Study", J. Mater. Sci.: Mater. Med. 15, 327-330 (2004).
- I. Zlotnikov, A. Dorogoy, D. Shilo, I. Gotman, E.Y. Gutmanas, "Nanoindentation, Modeling and Toughening Effects of Zirconia/Organic Nanolaminates" Adv. Eng. Mater. 12, 935-941 (2010).
