= Hydrogen safety =

Procedures for safe production, handling and use of hydrogen

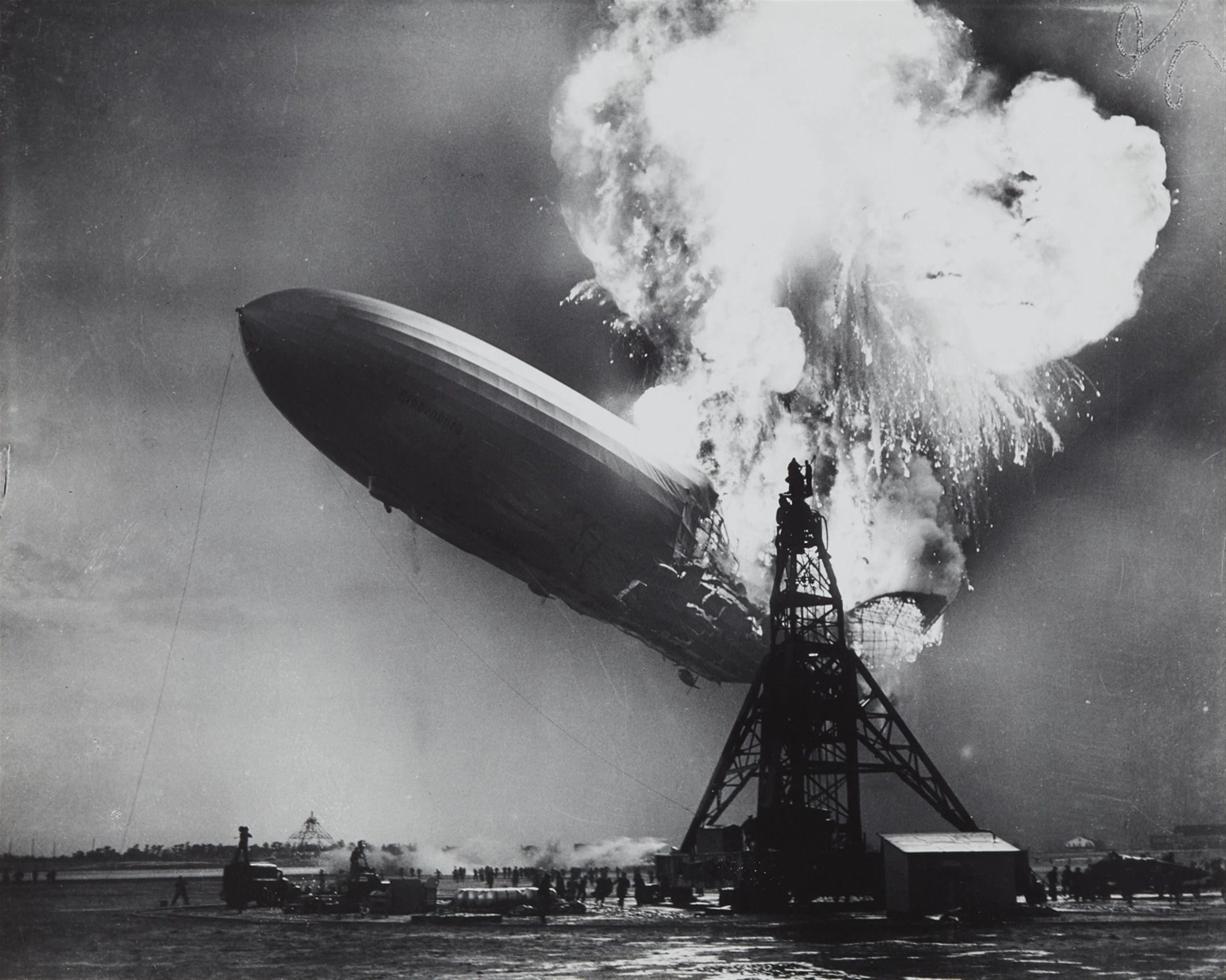
The Hindenburg disaster is an example of a large hydrogen explosion.

Hydrogen safety covers the safe production, handling and use of hydrogen, particularly hydrogen gas fuel and liquid hydrogen. Hydrogen possesses the NFPA 704's highest rating of four on the flammability scale because it is flammable when mixed even in small amounts with ordinary air. Ignition can occur at a volumetric ratio of hydrogen to air as low as 4% due to the oxygen in the air and the simplicity and chemical properties of the reaction. However, hydrogen has no rating for innate hazard for reactivity or toxicity. The storage and use of hydrogen poses unique challenges due to its ease of leaking as a gaseous fuel, low-energy ignition, wide range of combustible fuel-air mixtures, buoyancy, and its ability to embrittle metals that must be accounted for to ensure safe operation.

Liquid hydrogen poses additional challenges due to its increased density and the extremely low temperatures needed to keep it in liquid form. Moreover, its demand and use in industry—as rocket fuel, alternative energy storage source, coolant for electric generators in power stations, a feedstock in industrial and chemical processes including production of ammonia and methanol, etc.—has continued to increase, which has led to the increased importance of considerations of safety protocols in producing, storing, transferring, and using hydrogen.

Hydrogen has one of the widest explosive/ignition mix range with air of all the gases with few exceptions such as acetylene, silane, and ethylene oxide, and in terms of minimum necessary ignition energy and mixture ratios has extremely low requirements for an explosion to occur. This means that whatever the mix proportion between air and hydrogen, when ignited in an enclosed space a hydrogen leak will most likely lead to an explosion, not a mere flame.

There are many codes and standards regarding hydrogen safety in storage, transport, and use. These range from federal regulations, ANSI/AIAA, NFPA, and ISO standards. The Canadian Hydrogen Safety Program concluded that hydrogen fueling is as safe as, or safer than, compressed natural gas (CNG) fueling,

== Prevention ==
NFPA 704 safety square
- 0 4 0 SA The fire diamond hazard sign for both elemental hydrogen gas and its heavier isotope deuterium.

There are a number of items to consider to help design systems and procedures to avoid accidents when dealing with hydrogen, as one of the primary dangers of hydrogen is that it is extremely flammable.

=== Inerting and purging ===
Inerting chambers and purging gas lines are important standard safety procedures to take when transferring hydrogen. In order to properly inert or purge, the flammability limits must be taken into account, and hydrogen's are very different from other kinds of gases. At normal atmospheric pressure it is 4% to 75%, based on the volume percent of hydrogen in oxygen it is 4% to 94%, while the limits of the detonation potential of hydrogen in air are 18.3% to 59% by volume. In fact, these flammability limits can often be more stringent than this, as the turbulence during a fire can cause a deflagration which can create detonation. For comparison the deflagration limit of gasoline in air is 1.4–7.6%, and of acetylene in air, 2.5–82%.

Therefore, when equipment is open to air before or after a transfer of hydrogen, there are unique conditions to take into consideration that might have otherwise been safe with transferring other kinds of gases. Incidents have occurred because inerting or purging was not sufficient, or because the introduction of air in the equipment was underestimated (e.g., when adding powders), resulting in an explosion. For this reason, inerting or purging procedures and equipment are often unique to hydrogen, and often the fittings or marking on a hydrogen line should be completely different to ensure that this and other processes are properly followed, as many explosions have happened simply because a hydrogen line was accidentally plugged into a main line or because the hydrogen line was confused with another.

=== Ignition source management ===
The minimum ignition energy of hydrogen in air is one of the lowest among known substances at 0.02 mJ, and hydrogen-air mixtures can ignite with 1/10 the effort of igniting gasoline-air mixtures. Because of this, any possible ignition source has to be scrutinized. Any electrical device, bond, or ground should meet applicable hazardous area classification requirement. Any potential sources (like some ventilation system designs) for static electricity build-up should likewise be minimized, e.g. through antistatic devices.

Hot-work procedures must be robust, comprehensive, and well-enforced; and they should purge and ventilate high-areas and sample the atmosphere before work. Ceiling-mounted equipment should likewise meet hazardous area requirements (NFPA 497). Finally, rupture discs should not be used as this has been a common ignition source for multiple explosions and fires. Instead other pressure relief systems such as a relief valve should be used.

=== Mechanical integrity and reactive chemistry ===
There are four main chemical properties to account for when dealing with hydrogen that can come into contact with other materials even in normal atmospheric pressures and temperatures:

- The chemistry of hydrogen is very different from traditional chemicals. E.g., with oxidation in ambient environments. And neglecting this unique chemistry has caused issues at some chemical plants. Another aspect to be considered as well is the fact that hydrogen can be generated as a byproduct of a different reaction may have been overlooked, e.g. Zirconium and steam creating a source of hydrogen. This danger can be circumvented somewhat via the use of passive autocatalytic recombiners.
- Another major issue to consider is the chemical compatibility of hydrogen with other common building materials like steel. Because of hydrogen embrittlement, material compatibility with hydrogen is specially considered.
- These considerations can further change because of special reactions at high temperatures.
- The diffusivity of hydrogen is very different from ordinary gases, and therefore gasketing materials have to be chosen carefully.
- The buoyant forces and stresses on mechanical bodies involved are often reversed from standard gases. For example, because of buoyancy, stresses are often pronounced near the top of a large storage tank.

All four of these factors are considered during the initial design of a system using hydrogen, and is typically accomplished by limiting the contact between susceptible metals and hydrogen, either by spacing, electroplating, surface cleaning, material choice, and quality assurance during manufacturing, welding, and installation. Otherwise, hydrogen damage can be managed and detected by specialty monitoring equipment.

=== Leaks and flame detection systems ===
Locations of hydrogen sources and piping have to be chosen with care. Since hydrogen is a lighter-than-air gas, it collects under roofs and overhangs (typically referred to as trapping sites), where it forms an explosion hazard. Many individuals are familiar with protecting plants from heavier-than-air vapors, but are unfamiliar with "looking up", and is therefore of particular note. It can also enter pipes and can follow them to their destinations. Because of this, hydrogen pipes should be well-labeled and located above other pipes to prevent this occurrence.

Even with proper design, hydrogen leaks can support combustion at very low flow rates, as low as 4 micrograms/s. To this end, detection is important. Hydrogen sensors or a katharometer allow for rapid detection of hydrogen leaks to ensure that the hydrogen can be vented and the source of the leak tracked down. Around certain pipes or locations special tapes can be added for hydrogen detection purposes. A traditional method is to add a hydrogen odorant with the gas as is common with natural gas. In fuel cell applications these odorants can contaminate the fuel cells, but researchers are investigating other methods that might be used for hydrogen detection: tracers, new odorant technology, advanced sensors, and others.

While hydrogen flames can be hard to see with the naked eye (it can have a so-called "invisible flame"), they show up readily on UV/IR flame detectors. More recently Multi IR detectors have been developed, which have even faster detection on hydrogen-flames. This is quite important in fighting hydrogen fires, as the preferred method of fighting a fire is stopping the source of the leak, as in certain cases (namely, cryogenic hydrogen) dousing the source directly with water may cause icing, which in turn may cause a secondary rupture.

=== Ventilation and flaring ===
Aside from flammability concerns, in enclosed spaces, hydrogen can also act as an asphyxiant gas. Therefore, one should make sure to have proper ventilation to deal with both issues should they arise, as it is generally safe to simply vent hydrogen into the atmosphere. However, when placing and designing such ventilation systems, one must keep in mind that hydrogen will tend to accumulate towards the ceilings and peaks of structures, rather than the floor. Many dangers may be mitigated by the fact that hydrogen rapidly rises and often disperses before ignition.

In certain emergency or maintenance situations, hydrogen can also be flared. For example, a safety feature in some hydrogen-powered vehicles is that they can flare the fuel if the tank is on fire, burning out completely with little damage to the vehicle, in contrast to the expected result in a gasoline-fueled vehicle.

=== Inventory management and facility spacing ===
Ideally, no fire or explosion will occur, but the facility should be designed so that if accidental ignition occurs, it will minimize additional damage. Minimum separation distances between hydrogen storage units should be considered, together with the pressure of said storage units (cf., NFPA 2 and 55). Explosion venting should be laid out so that other parts of the facility will not be harmed. In certain situations, this translates to a roof that can be safely blown away from the rest of the structure in an explosion.

=== Cryogenics ===
Liquid hydrogen has a slightly different chemistry compared to other cryogenic chemicals, as trace accumulated air can easily contaminate liquid hydrogen and form an unstable mixture with detonative capabilities similar to TNT and other highly explosive materials. Because of this, liquid hydrogen requires complex storage technology such as the special thermally insulated containers and requires special handling common to all cryogenic substances. This is similar to, but more severe than liquid oxygen. Even with thermally insulated containers it is difficult to keep such a low temperature, and the hydrogen will gradually leak away. Typically it will evaporate at a rate of 1% per day.

The main danger with cryogenic hydrogen is what is known as BLEVE (boiling liquid expanding vapor explosion). Because hydrogen is gaseous in atmospheric conditions, the rapid phase change together with the detonation energy combine to create a more hazardous situation. A secondary danger is the fact that many materials change from being to ductile to brittle at extremely cold temperatures, allowing new places for leaks to form.

=== Human factors ===
Along with traditional job safety training, checklists to help prevent commonly skipped steps (e.g., testing high points in the work area) are often implemented, along with instructions on the situational dangers that come inherent to working with hydrogen.

== Incidents ==
Date	Location	Description	Suspected cause
6 May 1937	Naval Air Station Lakehurst	As the zeppelin Hindenburg was approaching landing, a fire detonated one of the aft hydrogen cells, thereby rupturing neighboring cells and causing the airship to fall to the ground aft-first. The inferno then travelled towards the stern, bursting and igniting the remaining cells.	Despite four news stations recording the disaster on film and surviving eyewitness testimonies from crew and people on the ground, the cause of the initial fire was never conclusively determined.
5 April 1975	Ilford, UK	An oxygen separator exploded due to hydrogen ingress. The resulting abrupt release of lye exposed one person who later died of lye burn injuries.	Mixing of oxygen and hydrogen due to breakdown of the electrolyser cells.
28 January 1986	Over the Atlantic Ocean just east of Kennedy Space Center	A large LH2 tank ruptured and exploded, killing all 7 astronauts aboard the Space Shuttle Challenger	A faulty O-ring on the solid rocket booster allowed hot gases and flames to impinge upon the external LH2 tank, causing the tank wall to weaken and then burst. The thrust generated from the contents of the tank caused the LOX tank above to also rupture, and this mixture of LH2/LOX then detonated, destroying the orbiter in the explosion.
1999	Hanau, Germany	A large chemical tank used to store hydrogen for manufacturing processes exploded.	The tank was designed to lie on its side, but instead was laid upright. The forces towards the top of the tank caused it to rupture and then explode.
January 2007	Muskingum River Coal Plant (owned and operated by AEP)	An explosion of compressed hydrogen during delivery at the Muskingum River Coal Plant caused significant damage and killed one person.	A premature rupture of a pressure relief disc used for the compressed hydrogen cooling system.
2011	Fukushima, Japan	Three reactor buildings were damaged by hydrogen explosions.	Exposed Zircaloy cladded fuel rods became very hot and reacted with steam, releasing hydrogen. The containments were filled with inert nitrogen, which prevented hydrogen from burning in the containment. However, the hydrogen leaked from the containment into the reactor building, where it mixed with air and exploded. To prevent further explosions, vent holes were opened in the top of the remaining reactor buildings.
2015	The Formosa Plastics Group refinery in Taiwan	Chemical plant explosion	Due to hydrogen leaking from a pipe
12 February 2018 13:20	Diamond Bar, a suburb of Los Angeles, CA	On the way to an FCV hydrogen station, a truck carrying about 24 compressed hydrogen tanks caught fire. This caused the evacuation initially of a one-mile radius area of Diamond Bar. The fire broke out on the truck at about 1:20 p.m. at the intersection of South Brea Canyon Road and Golden Springs Drive, according to a Los Angeles County Fire Department dispatcher.	The National Transportation Safety Board has launched an investigation.
August 2018	Veridam El Cajon, CA	A delivery truck carrying liquid hydrogen caught fire at Veridiam manufacturing plant. in El Cajon, California.	It is not known what caused the explosion.
May 2019	AB Specialty Silicones in Waukegan, Illinois	An explosion killed four workers and seriously injured a fifth.	Operator error adding an incorrect ingredient
23 May 2019	Gangwon Technopark in Gangneung, South Korea	A hydrogen tank exploded, killing two and injuring six.	Oxygen seeped into the hydrogen storage tanks.
June 2019	Air Products and Chemicals facility in Santa Clara, California	Tanker truck explosion damaging surrounding hydrogen transfill facility	Leak in transfer hose. This resulted in the temporary shutdown of multiple hydrogen fueling stations in the San Francisco area.
June 2019	Norway	A Uno-X fueling station experienced an explosion, resulting in the shutdown of all Uno-X hydrogen fueling stations and a temporary halt in sales of fuel cell vehicles in the country.	Investigations determined that neither the electrolyzer nor the dispenser used by customers had anything to do with this incident. Instead, Nel ASA announced the root cause of the incident had been identified as an assembly error of the use of a specific plug in a hydrogen tank in the high-pressure storage unit.
December 2019	An Airgas facility in Waukesha, Wisconsin	A gas explosion injured one worker and caused 2 hydrogen storage tanks to leak.	Unknown.
7 April 2020	OneH2 Hydrogen Fuel plant in Long View, North Carolina	An explosion caused significant damage to surrounding buildings. The blast was felt several miles away, damaging about 60 homes. No injuries from the explosion were reported.	The incident remains under investigation. The company published a press release: Hydrogen Safety Systems Operated Effectively, Prevented Injury at Plant Explosion.
11 June 2020	Praxair Inc., 703 6th St. Texas City, Texas	An explosion occurred at the hydrogen production plant.	No further details
30 September 2020	Changhua City, Taiwan	A hydrogen tanker crashed and exploded, killing the driver.	Vehicle crash
9 August 2021	Medupi Power Station in South Africa	An explosion in Unit 4 of the plant	Improper operator procedure while the generator was being purged of hydrogen
25 February 2022	Detroit, Michigan	A hydrogen tank for a balloon in a pick-up truck bed exploded, injuring 2.	The Detroit Fire Department believes a leak in the hydrogen tank caused the explosion.
22 April 2022	Towanda, Pennsylvania	A hydrogen tank at Global Tungsten & Powders Corp. exploded. A spokesperson for the company said five employees were taken to hospitals with non-life-threatening injuries.	OSHA and company officials are investigating the incident.
28 September 2022	Vasai, India	3 people killed, 8 injured in hydrogen cylinder explosion in at a Maharashtra Industrial unit.	Faulty tank.
6 February 2023	Delaware County, Ohio	A pickup truck towing a trailer carrying full hydrogen tanks on US-23 in Delaware County Ohio explodes after crash. Three people were transported to a hospital with minor injuries.	Vehicular crash
28 April 2023	Troutman, North Carolina	A Plug Power liquid hydrogen tanker venting and flaring caused an evacuation at a Pilot Travel Center in Troutman, North Carolina along the Charlotte Highway, Interstate 77.	Safety flare and vent due to excess pressure.
18 July 2023	Kern County, California	A Golden Empire Transit Bus was destroyed during fueling at their maintenance facility.	Leaking fuel tank.
8 August 2023	Lebring, Styria, Austria	An outdoor hydrogen tank exploded at the premises of HypTec in Austria, causing massive damage due to the pressure wave which could be felt 3 km away. The personnel at the site was indoor and only minor injuries to an employee occurred.	Leaky tank
17 September 2023	North West Queensland, Australia	Release of pressurised hydrogen gas at a chemical plant in North West Queensland resulted in an explosion and fire. Three workers were injured and damage caused to plant. The incident occurred during the recommissioning of equipment after routine scheduled maintenance. The injured workers did not require hospitalisation.	Failure of a butterfly valve, under hydrogen header-pressure of approximately 2000kPa. The bearing bush bolts of the butterfly valve may not have been correctly installed at the time of overhaul.
26 June 2024	Gersthofen, Germany	A fire broke out after an apparent explosion at a newly opened hydrogen filling station in the freight transport center in Gersthofen in Augsburg. No one was injured. The station remained closed after the incident.	Probably an explosion in a compressor.
19 September 2024	Geismar, Louisiana	A hydrogen gas explosion and fire occurred at Chevron Renewable Energy Group's renewable diesel plant. Two workers were seriously injured.	Under investigation.
23 December 2024	Chungju, South Korea	A hydrogen gas explosion occurred in a bus after being refueled at a hydrogen filling station. Three persons were injured, one of them seriously.	Under investigation.
17 October 2025	Ulsan, South Korea	Two of five at plant fire die from burns at SK Energy's fluidized catalytic cracking (FCC) factory in Yongyeon-dong, Nam-gu, Ulsan.	SK Energy stated "Hydrogen gas remaining inside the pipeline exploded during the process of opening it."

== Hydrogen codes and standards ==
There exist many hydrogen codes and standards for hydrogen fuel cell vehicles, stationary fuel cell applications and portable fuel cell applications. Additional to the codes and standards for hydrogen technology products, there are codes and standards for hydrogen safety, for the safe handling of hydrogen and the storage of hydrogen. What follows is a list of some of the major codes and standards regulating hydrogen:

Name of standard	Short title
29CFR1910.103	Gaseous and cryogenic hydrogen handling and storage
29CFR1910.119	Process safety management of highly hazardous chemicals
40CFR68	Chemical accident prevention provisions
49CFR	Regulations on shipping and handling hydrogen gas and cryogenic hydrogen
ISO 13984:1999	Liquid hydrogen — Land vehicle fuelling system interface
ISO/AWI 13984	Liquid Hydrogen Land Vehicle Fueling Protocol
ISO/AWI 13985	Liquid hydrogen — Land vehicle fuel tanks
ISO/CD 14687	Hydrogen fuel quality — Product specification
ISO/AWI TR 15916	Basic considerations for the safety of hydrogen systems
ISO 16110	Hydrogen generators using fuel processing technologies
ISO 16111	Transportable gas storage devices — Hydrogen absorbed in reversible metal hydride
ISO/AWI 17268	Gaseous hydrogen land vehicle refuelling connection devices
ISO 19880	Gaseous hydrogen — Fuelling stations
ISO/AWI 19881	Gaseous hydrogen — Land vehicle fuel containers
ISO 19882	Gaseous hydrogen — Thermally activated pressure relief devices for compressed hydrogen vehicle fuel containers
ISO/TS 19883	Safety of pressure swing adsorption systems for hydrogen separation and purification
ISO/WD 19884	Gaseous hydrogen — Cylinders and tubes for stationary storage
ISO/CD 19885	Gaseous hydrogen — Fuelling protocols for hydrogen-fueled vehicles — Part 1: Design and development process for fueling protocols
ISO/CD 19887	Gaseous Hydrogen — Fuel system components for hydrogen fuelled vehicles
ISO/AWI 22734	Hydrogen generators using water electrolysis — Industrial, commercial, and residential applications
ISO/AWI 24078	Hydrogen in energy systems — Vocabulary
ISO 26142:2010	Hydrogen detection apparatus — Stationary applications
NFPA 2	Hydrogen technologies code
NFPA 30A	Rules for design of refueling stations
NFPA 50A	Standard for gaseous hydrogen systems at consumer sites
NFPA 50B	Standard for liquefied hydrogen systems at consumer sites
NFPA 52	Compressed Natural Gas Vehicular Fuel Systems Code
NFPA 57	Liquefied natural gas vehicular fuel systems standard
CGA C-6.4	Methods for External Visual Inspection of Natural Gas Vehicle (NGV) and Hydrogen Gas Vehicle (HGV) Fuel Containers and Their Installations
CGA G-5	Hydrogen
CGA G-5.3	Commodity Specification for Hydrogen
CGA G-5.4	Standard for Hydrogen Piping Systems at User Locations
CGA G-5.5	Hydrogen Vent Systems
CGA G-5.6	Hydrogen Pipeline Systems
CGA G-5.7	Carbon Monoxide and Syngas Pipeline Systems
CGA H-3	Standard for Cryogenic Hydrogen Storage
CGA H-4	Terminology Associated with Hydrogen Fuel Technologies
CGA H-5	Standard for Bulk Hydrogen Supply Systems (an American National Standard)
CGA H-7	Standard Procedures for Hydrogen Supply Systems
CGA H-10	Combustion Safety for Steam Reformer Operation
CGA H-11	Safe Startup and Shutdown Practices for Steam Reformers
CGA H-12	Mechanical Integrity of Syngas Outlet Systems
CGA H-13	Hydrogen Pressure Swing Adsorber (PSA) Mechanical Integrity Requirements
CGA H-14	HYCO Plant Gas Leak Detection and Response Practices
CGA H-15	Safe Catalyst Handling in HYCO Plants
CGA H-16	Guideline on Remedial Actions for HYCO Plant Components Subject to High Temperature Hydrogen Attack
CGA P-6	Standard Density Data, Atmospheric Gases and Hydrogen
CGA P-28	OSHA Process Safety Management and EPA Risk Management Plan Guidance Document for Bulk Liquid Hydrogen Supply Systems
CGA P-74	Standard for Tube Trailer Supply Systems at Customer Sites
CGA PS-31	CGA Position Statement on Cleanliness for Proton Exchange Membranes Hydrogen Piping/Components
CGA PS-33	CGA Position Statement on Use of LPG or Propane Tank as Compressed Hydrogen Storage Buffers
CGA PS-46	CGA Position Statement on Roofs Over Hydrogen Storage Systems
CGA PS-48	CGA Position Statement on Clarification of Existing Hydrogen Setback Distances and Development of New Hydrogen Setback Distances in NFPA 55
CGA PS-69	CGA Position Statement on Liquefied Hydrogen Supply System Separation Distances

=== Guidelines ===
The current ANSI/AIAA standard for hydrogen safety guidelines is AIAA G-095-2004, Guide to Safety of Hydrogen and Hydrogen Systems. As NASA has been one of the world's largest users of hydrogen, this evolved from NASA's earlier guidelines, NSS 1740.16 (8719.16). These documents cover both the risks posed by hydrogen in its different forms and how to ameliorate them. NASA also references Safety Standard for Hydrogen and Hydrogen Systems and the Sourcebook for Hydrogen Applications.

Another organization responsible for hydrogen safety guidelines is the Compressed Gas Association (CGA), which has a number of references of their own covering general hydrogen storage, piping, and venting.

In 2023 CGA launched the Safe Hydrogen Project which is a collaborative global effort to develop and distribute safety information for the production, storage, transport, and use of hydrogen.

== See also ==
- Dissolved gas analysis
- Electrical equipment in hazardous areas
- Hydrogen economy
- Metallic hydrogen
- Oxyhydrogen
- Passive autocatalytic recombiner
- Slush hydrogen
