= Passive autocatalytic recombiner =

Nuclear reactor safety device

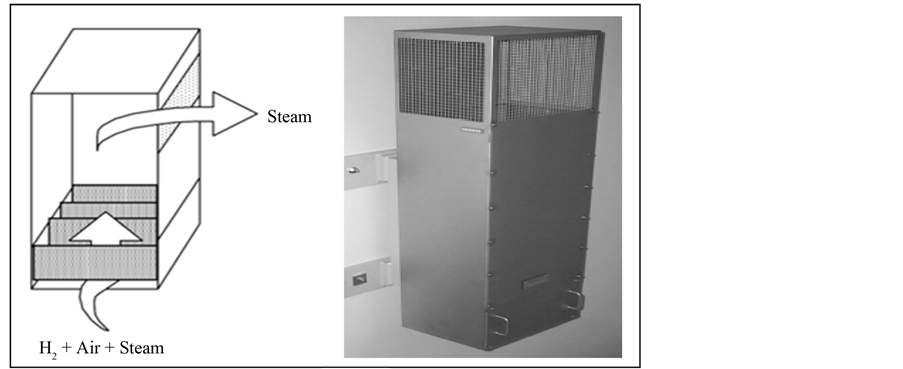
Passive autocatalytic recombiner

Passive autocatalytic recombiner (PAR) is a device that removes hydrogen from the containment of a nuclear power plant during an accident. Its purpose is to prevent hydrogen explosions. Recombiners come into action spontaneously as soon as the hydrogen concentration increases. They are passive devices because their operation does not require external energy.

Hydrogen may be generated in a nuclear accident if the reactor fuel overheats and zirconium cladding of the fuel rods reacts chemically with steam. If the hydrogen is released from the reactor to the containment, it may get mixed with air and form a flammable or even explosive mixture. A hydrogen explosion could break the containment and cause radioactive materials to be released to the environment. Recombiners aim at removing hydrogen and thereby preventing explosions.

Inside a recombiner there are plates or pellets that are coated with platinum or palladium catalyst. On the surface of the catalyst, hydrogen and oxygen molecules react chemically at low temperature and low hydrogen concentration. The reaction generates steam. The reaction starts spontaneously when the hydrogen concentration reaches 1–2 percent. Burning of hydrogen in air requires at least 4 percent hydrogen concentration, and even higher for an explosion. Therefore, a recombiner is able to remove hydrogen from the containment before a flammable concentration is reached.

A recombiner is a box that is open from the bottom and from the top. The catalyst is located at the lower part of the box. The reaction of hydrogen and oxygen on the catalyst surface generates heat, and temperature in the recombiner reaches hundreds of degrees Celsius. Hot steam is lighter than the air in the containment, so buoyancy is caused inside the recombiner, much like in a chimney. This causes a strong airflow through the recombiner, feeding hydrogen and oxygen from the containment to the device.

Hundreds of kilograms of hydrogen may be generated in a few hours during a severe reactor accident. The most efficient recombiner made by Framatome (formerly Areva) removes slightly over five kilograms of hydrogen per hour when the hydrogen concentration is four percent. Therefore, many recombiners are needed. For example, the containment of Olkiluoto 3 EPR in Finland has 50 recombiners.

Manufacturers of passive autocatalytic recombiners include Framatome, SNC-Lavalin (formerly Atomic Energy of Canada Ltd, AECL), and German Siempelkamp-NIS.

== See also ==
- Hydrogen safety
