= 2004 Paris Motor Show =

International auto show

- Genre: Auto Show
- Begins: September 25, 2004
- Ends: October 10, 2004
- Venue: Paris Expo Porte de Versailles
- Location: Paris
- Country: France
- Previous event: 2002 Paris Motor Show
- Next event: 2006 Paris Motor Show

The 2004 Paris Motor Show (Mondial de l'Automobile) took place from 25 September to 10 October 2004 in Paris expo Porte de Versailles. There was an extra exhibition called L'Automobile et la bande Dessinée ("The Car and the Stripbook") in Palace 8.

== Introductions ==
- Alfa Romeo 147
- Aston Martin Vanquish S
- Audi A3 Sportback
- Audi A4
- BMW 1 Series (E87)
- BMW 5 Series (E60) M-Sport
- BMW M5
- Chevrolet Kalos (three door)
- Chevrolet M3X
- Chevrolet S3X
- Chrysler 300C Touring
- Citroën C4
- Citroën C5 (facelift)
- Ferrari F430
- Fiat Panda 4x4 Climbing
- Fiat Stilo Uproad
- Ford Focus (three and five door hatchbacks, station wagon)
- Honda CR-V (diesel)
- Honda FR-V
- Honda Jazz
- Hyundai Coupe
- Hyundai Sonata
- Kia Sportage
- Lancia Musa
- Lexus GS 300
- Maserati MC12
- Mazda 5
- Mazda6 MPS
- Mercedes-Benz A-Class (W169)
- Mercedes-Benz Vision B
- Mercedes-Benz Vision R
- Mercedes-Benz CLS-Class (W219)
- MG TF (France Only)
- Mitsubishi Colt CZ3/CZT
- Mitsubishi Outlander (turbo)
- Nissan Pathfinder (European debut)
- Opel Astra GTC
- Peugeot 1007
- Peugeot 607 (facelift)
- Peugeot 907
- Porsche 911 (997) Carrera
- Porsche Cayman (987)
- Renault Fluence Concept
- Renault Wind Concept
- Rover 75 ("100th anniversary")
- Seat Toledo
- Skoda Fabia (Typ6Y facelift)
- Škoda Octavia Wagon
- Smart Forfour Sportstyle
- Suzuki Swift
- Toyota Land Cruiser
- Volkswagen Golf GTI
- Volvo XC90 V8
