= Metal hydride fuel cell =

Type of fuel cell

Metal hydride fuel cells are a subclass of alkaline fuel cells that have been under research and development, as well as scaled up successfully in operating systems. A notable feature is their ability to chemically bond and store hydrogen within the fuel cell itself.

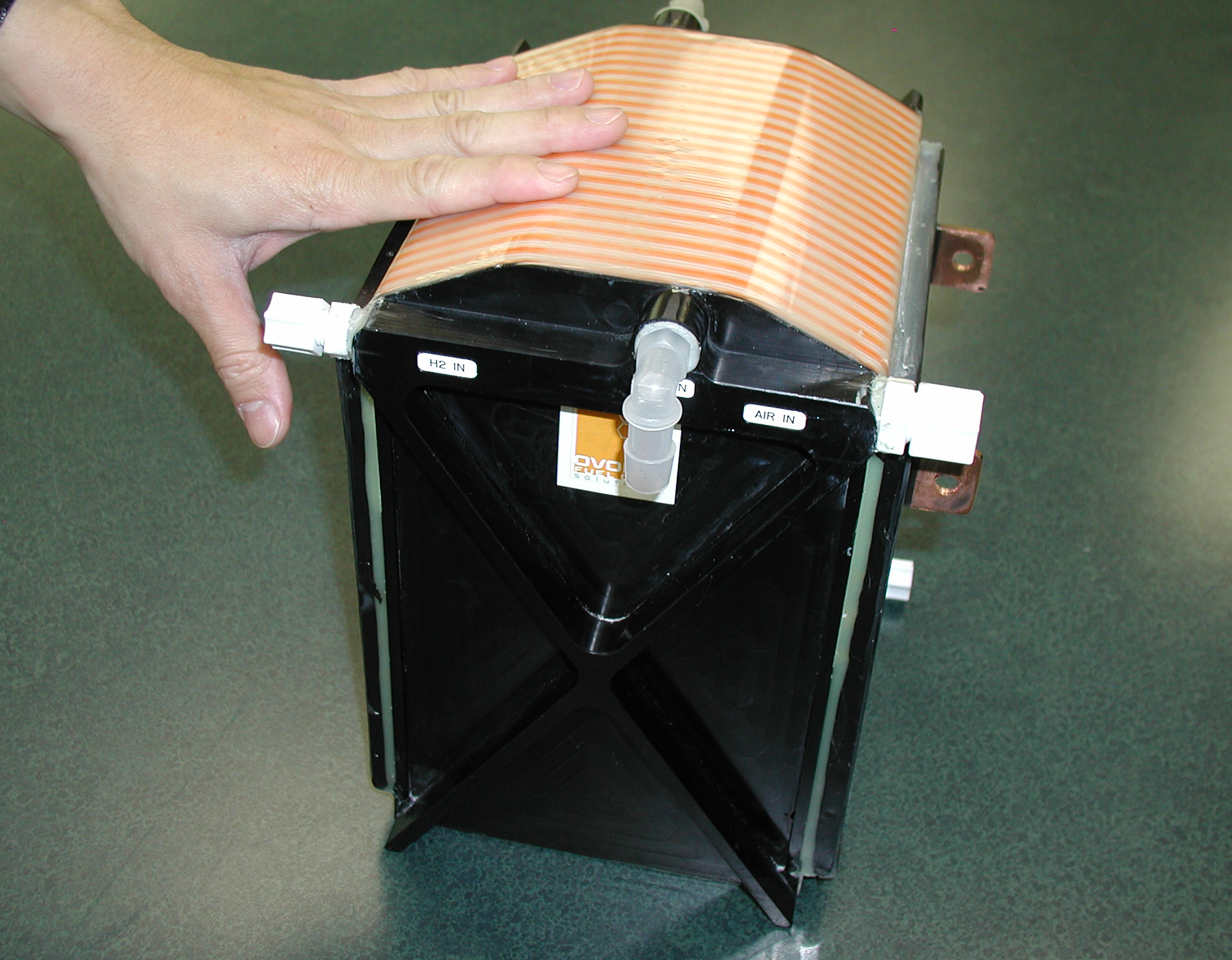
1.5 kW Metal Hydride Fuel Cell Stack

== Characteristics ==
Metal hydride fuel cells have demonstrated the following characteristics:

- The ability to be recharged with electrical energy (similar to NiMH batteries)
- Operating at low temperatures (down to −20 °C)
- Fast "cold start" properties
- Ability to operate for limited periods of time with no external hydrogen fuel source, enabling "hot swapping" of fuel canisters

== Performance ==
Electrode active areas of metal hydride fuel cells have been scaled up from 60 cm^{2} to 250 cm^{2}, enabling systems to be scaled up to 500 Watts. The scaling up of electrode active areas also provided capabilities to develop higher power fuel cell stacks, each with 1500 Watts of power. Metal hydride fuel cells have achieved a current density of 250 mA/cm^{2}. To test durability, fuel cell stacks were successfully operated for more than 7000 hours.

== Operating systems and applications ==
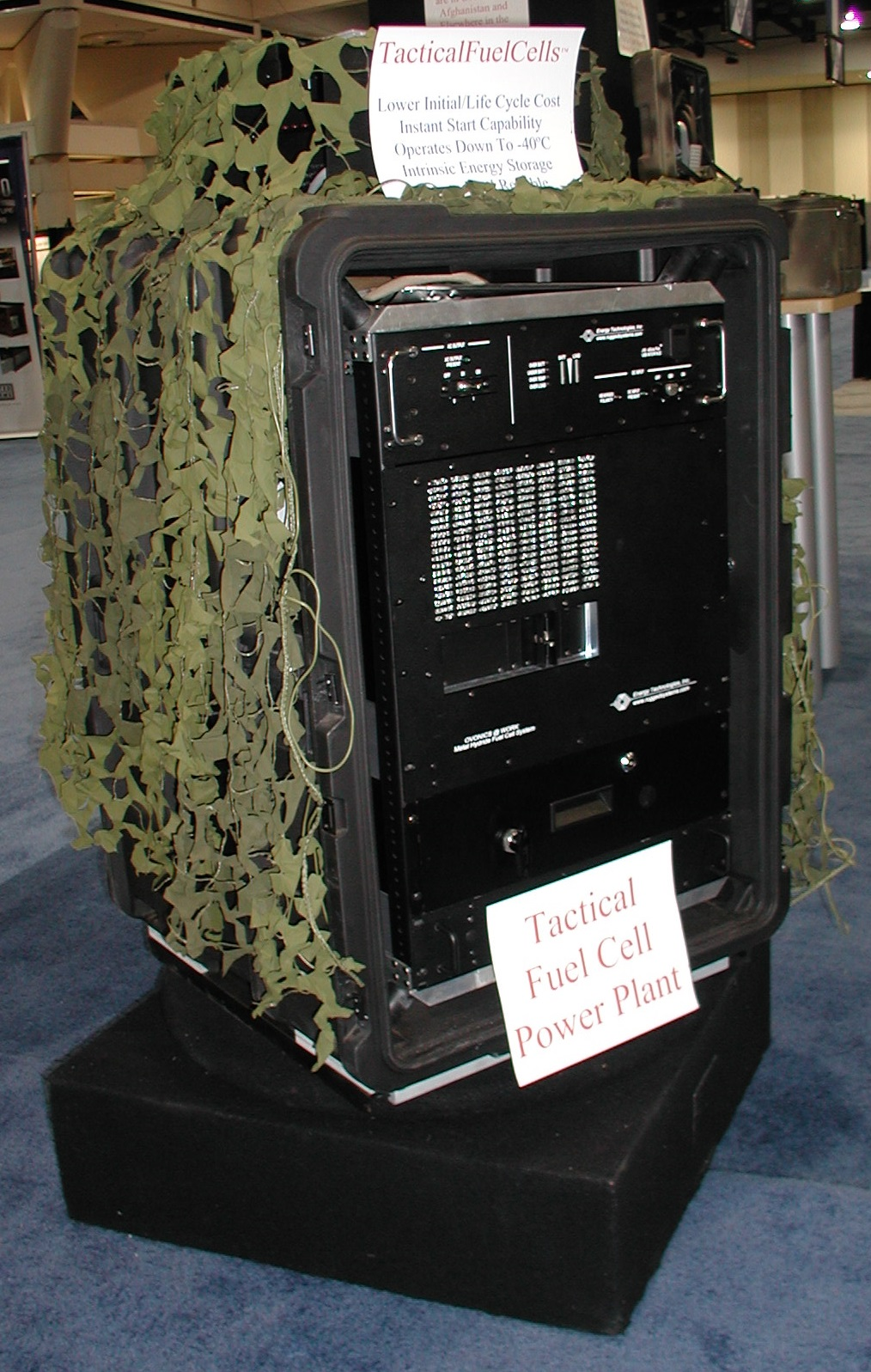
Operating 1.0 kW Metal Hydride Fuel Cell System

During the earlier phases of product development, there was a focus on single fuel cells and fuel cell stacks composed of multiple cells. The target applications included critical backup power for military and commercial applications. The next phase was to design and build complete fuel cell systems that could be taken outside of the laboratory. Initial 50 Watt laboratory-based demonstration systems were integrated into 50 Watt portable systems with more robust packaging and interfacing. Additional developments in both the fuel cell stack and system integration enabled a 1.0 kW system, complete with an inverter and onboard hydrogen storage using metal hydride storage canisters, to be operated and demonstrated in public. Further developments in metal hydride fuel cell systems were pursued for the field power needs of soldiers, resulting in a prototype system meeting deployment requirements. In tandem with product development, there was also a focus on developing capabilities for manufacturing and testing. Metal hydride fuel cell systems have been integrated into microgrid systems at military bases for testing and evaluation. Despite challenges, the military maintains an active interest in fuel cells for a broad range of applications, including unmanned aerial vehicles, autonomous underwater vehicle, light-duty trucks, buses, and wearable technology systems. Development of metal hydride fuel cell systems is continuing for military applications, with onboard hydrogen generation and fuel cells up to 5.0 kW.

== See also ==
- Glossary of fuel cell terms
- Hydrogen technologies
