= Hydrogen embrittlement =

Reduction in ductility of a metal exposed to hydrogen

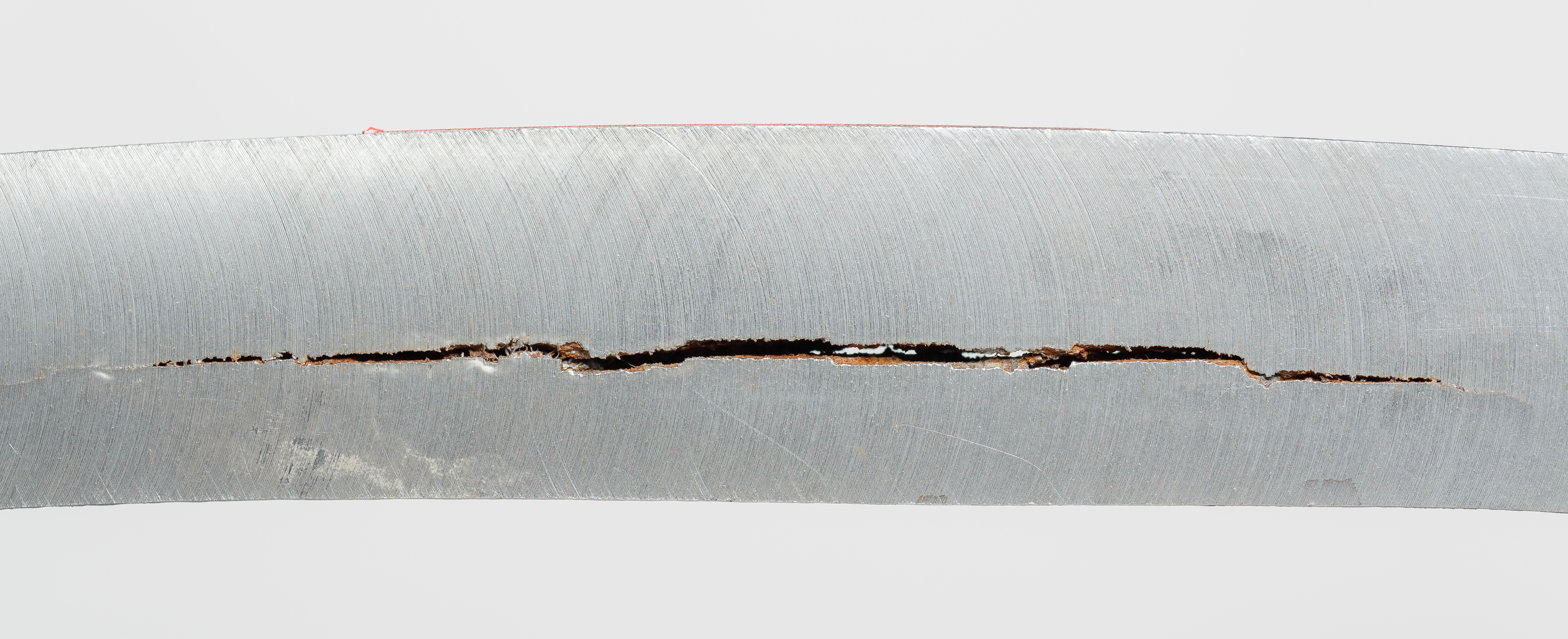
Hydrogen-induced cracking (HIC)

Hydrogen embrittlement (HE), also known as hydrogen-assisted cracking or hydrogen-induced cracking (HIC), is a reduction in the ductility of a metal due to absorbed hydrogen. Hydrogen atoms are small and can permeate solid metals. Once absorbed, hydrogen lowers the stress required for cracks in the metal to initiate and propagate, resulting in embrittlement. Hydrogen embrittlement occurs in steels and palladium, as well as in iron, nickel, titanium, cobalt, and their alloys. Copper, aluminium, and stainless steels are generally less susceptible.

The essential facts about the nature of hydrogen embrittlement have been known since the 19th century. Hydrogen embrittlement is maximised at around room temperature in steels, and most metals are relatively immune to hydrogen embrittlement at temperatures above 150 °C. Hydrogen embrittlement requires the presence of both atomic ("diffusible") hydrogen and a mechanical stress to induce crack growth, although that stress may be applied or residual. Hydrogen embrittlement increases at lower strain rates. In general, higher-strength steels are more susceptible to hydrogen embrittlement than mid-strength steels.

Metals can be exposed to hydrogen from two types of sources: gaseous dihydrogen and atomic hydrogen chemically generated at the metal surface. Atomic hydrogen dissolves quickly into the metal at room temperature and leads to embrittlement. Gaseous dihydrogen is found in pressure vessels and pipelines. Electrochemical sources of hydrogen include acids (as may be encountered during pickling, etching, or cleaning), corrosion (typically due to aqueous corrosion or cathodic protection), and electroplating. Hydrogen can also be introduced during manufacturing by the presence of moisture during welding or while the metal is molten. The most common causes of failure in practice are poorly controlled electroplating or damp welding rods.

Hydrogen embrittlement as a term can be used either specifically for embrittlement in steels and similar metals at relatively low hydrogen concentrations, or more broadly to encompass all embrittling effects that hydrogen has on metals. These broader effects include hydride formation, which occurs in titanium and vanadium but not in steels, and hydrogen-induced blistering, which generally occurs at high hydrogen concentrations and does not require the presence of stress. However, hydrogen embrittlement is usually distinguished from high temperature hydrogen attack (HTHA), which occurs in steels at temperatures above 204 °C and involves the formation of methane pockets. The mechanisms by which hydrogen causes embrittlement in steels are not comprehensively understood and continue to be actively investigated.

Hydrogen-related degradation is also a significant concern in large energy systems, particularly in hydrogen-cooled turbogenerators, where prolonged exposure to hydrogen atmospheres may influence the structural integrity of rotor steels and associated components.

== Mechanisms ==
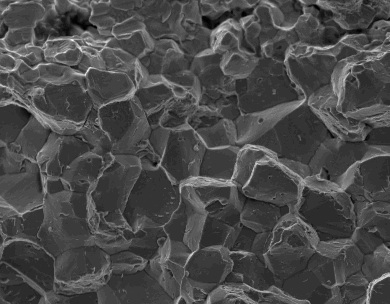
Crack in a hardened steel due to hydrogen, observed by scanning electron microscopy (SEM).

Hydrogen embrittlement is a complex process involving a number of distinct contributing micro-mechanisms, not all of which need to be present. It is now widely accepted that hydrogen embrittlement depends on material and environment, with no single mechanism exclusively applicable. The mechanisms include the formation of brittle hydrides, the creation of voids that can lead to high-pressure bubbles, enhanced decohesion at internal surfaces, and localised plasticity at crack tips that assist in the propagation of cracks. A wide variety of mechanisms have been proposed and investigated as causes of brittleness once diffusible hydrogen has dissolved into the metal.

- Internal pressure: At high hydrogen concentrations, absorbed hydrogen species recombine in voids to form hydrogen molecules (H_{2}), creating pressure from within the metal. This pressure can increase to levels where cracks form, commonly designated hydrogen-induced cracking (HIC), as well as blisters forming on the specimen surface, designated hydrogen-induced blistering. These effects can reduce ductility and tensile strength.
- Hydrogen-enhanced localised plasticity (HELP): Hydrogen increases the nucleation and movement of dislocations at a crack tip. HELP results in crack propagation by localised ductile failure at the crack tip, with less deformation occurring in the surrounding material, which gives a brittle appearance to the fracture.
- Hydrogen-decreased dislocation emission: Molecular dynamics simulations suggest a ductile-to-brittle transition caused by the suppression of dislocation emission at the crack tip by dissolved hydrogen. This prevents crack-tip blunting and promotes brittle cleavage-like failure.
- Hydrogen-enhanced decohesion (HEDE): Interstitial hydrogen lowers the stress required for metal atoms to fracture apart. HEDE can occur when the local concentration of hydrogen is high, such as at crack tips, stress concentrators, or in the tension field of edge dislocations.
- Metal hydride formation: The formation of brittle hydrides allows cracks to propagate in a brittle manner. This is particularly important in vanadium alloys, while most structural steels do not readily form hydrides.
- Phase transformations: Hydrogen can induce phase transformations in some materials, and the new phase may be less ductile.

=== Hydrogen embrittlement in tribological systems ===
Hydrogen embrittlement may also influence degradation processes in steels subjected to frictional and contact loading. Absorbed hydrogen can accumulate at dislocations, grain boundaries and other lattice defects, facilitating localized plasticity and promoting crack initiation in near-surface layers. Under sliding and rolling contact conditions, hydrogen-assisted changes in microstructure and stress state may reduce wear resistance and modify the morphology of wear debris formed during friction. Experimental studies on high-nitrogen manganese steels have demonstrated that hydrogen charging can affect tribological behaviour and fracture mechanisms under both dry sliding and rolling contact conditions. Similar hydrogen-assisted fracture and embrittlement phenomena in steels have also been discussed within the framework of hydrogen-enhanced localized plasticity mechanisms.

=== Hydrogen effects in steels ===
Hydrogen exposure may also influence the mechanical and tribological behaviour of alloyed steels during machining and wear processes. Studies on high-nickel steels have indicated that hydrogen absorption can modify the properties of the surface layer, affect plastic deformation during cutting, and influence the formation of wear products and surface damage under lubricated friction conditions.

Recent diagnostic approaches have therefore focused on identifying hydrogen-induced degradation in rotor steels and developing monitoring methods for damaged regions during maintenance and repair operations of turbo-aggregates. Non-Destructive methods like In situ eddy current and ultrasonic monitoring of hydrogen diffusion is also reported

=== Nanopore nucleation and hydrogen-assisted crack initiation ===
Recent studies have shown that hydrogen-assisted degradation processes may involve the nucleation of nanoscale defects and nanopores in structural alloys, which subsequently act as sites for crack initiation and propagation. Experimental investigations of Ni–Co superalloys demonstrated that hydrogen can accelerate nanopore nucleation and promote microcrack formation under mechanical loading.

Hydrogen-assisted damage in metallic materials is often associated with the formation of nanoscale defects that act as precursors to crack initiation. In hydrogen-containing environments, absorbed hydrogen can accumulate at lattice defects, grain boundaries, and dislocation structures, promoting localized plasticity and facilitating the nucleation of nanopores. Similar degradation mechanisms have also been discussed for structural steels operating in hydrogen-rich environments, including hydrogen-cooled turbo-generator systems, where hydrogen diffusion and accumulation may influence the integrity of rotor steels and their resistance to cracking.

== Material susceptibility ==
Hydrogen embrittles a variety of metals including steel, aluminium (at high temperatures only), and titanium. Austempered iron is also susceptible, though austempered steel displays increased resistance to hydrogen embrittlement. NASA has reviewed which metals are susceptible to embrittlement and which are more prone to hot hydrogen attack, including nickel alloys, austenitic stainless steels, aluminium alloys, and copper alloys. Sandia National Laboratories has also produced a comprehensive technical reference.

=== Steels ===
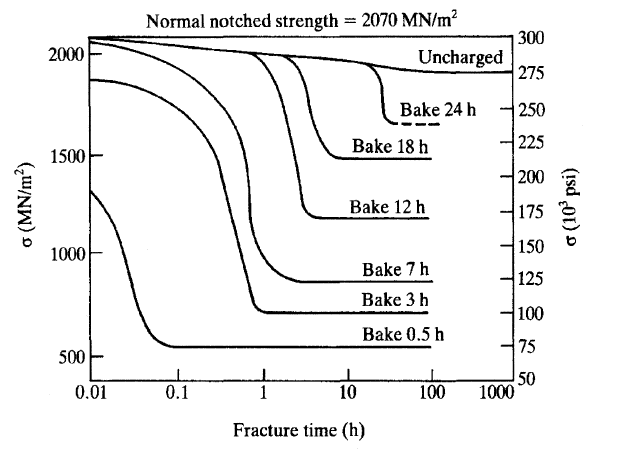
Steels embrittled with hydrogen through cathodic charging. Heat treatment (baking) was used to reduce hydrogen content. Lower bake times resulted in quicker fracture times due to higher hydrogen content.

Steel with an ultimate tensile strength of less than 1000 MPa (~145,000 psi) or hardness below HRC 32 on the Rockwell scale is not generally considered highly susceptible to hydrogen embrittlement. As an example of severe embrittlement, the elongation at failure of 17-4PH precipitation-hardened stainless steel was measured to drop from 17% to only 1.7% when smooth specimens were exposed to high-pressure hydrogen.

As the strength of steels increases, the fracture toughness decreases, so the likelihood that hydrogen embrittlement will lead to fracture increases. In high-strength steels, anything above a hardness of HRC 32 may be susceptible to early hydrogen cracking after plating processes that introduce hydrogen. Such steels may also experience delayed failures from weeks to decades after being placed in service due to the accumulation of hydrogen over time from cathodic protection and other sources. Numerous failures have been reported in the hardness range from HRC 32–36 and above; therefore, parts in this range are often checked during quality control to ensure that they are not susceptible.

Testing the fracture toughness of hydrogen-charged, embrittled specimens is complicated by the need to keep charged specimens very cold, for example in liquid nitrogen, to prevent hydrogen diffusion losses during handling.

=== Palladium ===
Palladium is known to suffer the effects of hydrogen embrittlement because of its natural affinity to the molecule. Hydrogen atoms are able to enter the material lattice of the pure substance, and in doing so, expand the overall object and form hydrides. Via the constant expansion and contraction of the lattice, the palladium undergoes mechanical stress, exemplified by palladium's innate ability to absorb roughly 900x its own volume in hydrogen.

The most effective way to prevent hydrogen embrittlement in palladium is by alloying the element, often with noble metals. A notable example of this is silver, which performs lattice constraint to prevent the hydrogen from entering the palladium's inter-atomic spaces, therefore preventing the expansion and contraction leading to the cracking and flaking. The most often mechanical failure of palladium occurs when it is used as a filter for hydrogen. Because Palladium naturally permits hydrogen convection pathways while blocking other molecules, it is used in a large number of hydrogen filters. When this is done without the application of an alloying agent, hydrogen embrittlement destroys the surface via cracking and expansion-contraction mechanical stress.

=== Surface effects and tribological degradation ===
Hydrogen can also influence surface degradation processes in metallic materials subjected to friction and contact loading. The presence of absorbed hydrogen may alter tribological behaviour by affecting dislocation mobility, surface plasticity, and crack nucleation in near-surface layers. Experimental studies on structural steels have shown that hydrogen charging combined with mechanical loading can significantly modify tribotechnical properties, including wear resistance and friction behaviour, thereby accelerating surface damage under operational conditions.

Hydrogen may also influence the surface behavior of steels during mechanical processing and tribological contact. In hydrogen-containing environments, absorbed hydrogen can accumulate at lattice defects, dislocations and grain boundaries, altering local plastic deformation mechanisms in the surface layer. Experimental studies have shown that hydrogen may affect chip formation during machining of alloy steels by modifying the stress state in the cutting zone and promoting localized deformation and microcrack nucleation. Such processes can influence the morphology and fragmentation of chips as well as the formation of wear debris during sliding friction.

=== Pipeline steels ===
For pipeline steels such as API 5L X70 and X80, hydrogen uptake and environment-assisted cracking are major integrity concerns, recent reviews synthesize hydrogen behaviour, embrittlement mechanisms, and mitigation strategies specific to line-pipe grades. Under high-pressure gaseous hydrogen, laboratory evaluations on X70 line-pipe steel have shown reductions in fracture toughness and accelerated fatigue-crack growth under blended-hydrogen service conditions. In acidic environments containing H_{2}S, hydrogen-induced cracking and blistering have been reported to correlate with inclusion morphology and sulfur content in pipeline and pressure-vessel steels.

=== Copper ===
Copper alloys containing oxygen can be embrittled if exposed to hot hydrogen. Hydrogen diffuses through the copper and reacts with inclusions of Cu_{2}O, forming metallic copper and H_{2}O, which then forms pressurised bubbles of steam at the grain boundaries. This process can force grains apart in a phenomenon often referred to as steam embrittlement.

=== Vanadium, nickel, and titanium ===
Alloys of vanadium, nickel, and titanium have high hydrogen solubility and can therefore absorb significant amounts of hydrogen. This can lead to hydride formation, resulting in irregular volume expansion and reduced ductility. This is a particular issue in the development of non-palladium-based alloys for hydrogen separation membranes.

=== Zirconium alloys ===
Hydrogen embrittlement in alloys of zirconium presents the risk of material degradation in nuclear reactor fuel rod cladding and structural components. Hydrogen absorbed into the alloy (introduced by corrosion, impurities, or radiolytic decomposition) forms brittle zirconium hydride (ZrH_{2}) platelets, which induce high tensile stresses at the platelet edges that lead to crack propagation when under thermomechanical stress. Recent imaging studies reveal potential mitigating mechanisms such as reducing radial hydride connectivity through hydride reorientation treatments.

== Fatigue ==
While many failures in practice involve delayed or fast fracture, there is experimental evidence that hydrogen also affects the fatigue properties of steels. In general, hydrogen embrittlement has a strong effect on high-stress, low-cycle fatigue, and a much smaller effect on high-cycle fatigue.

== Environmental embrittlement ==
Hydrogen embrittlement is a volume effect: it affects the bulk of the material. Environmental embrittlement is a surface effect where molecules from the surrounding atmosphere are adsorbed onto the newly created crack surface. This is especially evident in fatigue measurements, where crack growth rates can be an order of magnitude higher in hydrogen than in air. Environmental embrittlement is also observed to reduce fracture toughness in fast-fracture tests, although its severity is usually less than that of bulk hydrogen embrittlement.

Hydrogen embrittlement occurs when a previously embrittled material has low fracture toughness regardless of the atmosphere in which it is tested. Environmental embrittlement occurs when the low fracture toughness is only observed in that atmosphere.

== Sources of hydrogen ==
During manufacture, hydrogen can be dissolved into components by processes such as phosphating, pickling, electroplating, casting, surface cleaning, electrochemical machining, welding, hot roll forming, and heat treatment.

During service, hydrogen can enter metals through wet corrosion or through inappropriate use of protection measures such as cathodic protection. In one reported case during the construction of the San Francisco–Oakland Bay Bridge, galvanized rods were left wet for several years before being tensioned, and the reaction of zinc with water introduced hydrogen into the steel.

A common case of embrittlement during manufacture is poor arc welding practice, in which hydrogen is released from moisture in welding consumables. To avoid atomic hydrogen formation in the high-temperature plasma of the welding arc, welding rods must be properly dried before use. Another way to minimise the formation of hydrogen is to use special low-hydrogen electrodes for welding high-strength steels.

Apart from arc welding, the most common problems arise from chemical or electrochemical processes which, by reduction of hydrogen ions or water, generate hydrogen atoms at the surface that rapidly dissolve in the metal. One such reaction involves hydrogen sulfide (H_{2}S) in sulfide stress cracking (SSC), a significant problem for the oil and gas industries.

After a manufacturing process or treatment that may cause hydrogen ingress, the component should often be baked to remove or immobilise the hydrogen.

== Prevention ==
Hydrogen embrittlement can be mitigated through several methods, all centred on minimising contact between the metal and hydrogen, particularly during fabrication and service. Embrittling procedures such as acid pickling should be carefully controlled, as should contact with species such as sulfur and phosphate.

If the metal has not yet started to crack, hydrogen embrittlement can sometimes be reversed by removing the hydrogen source and causing the hydrogen within the metal to diffuse out through heat treatment. This de-embrittlement process, known as low hydrogen annealing or "baking", is commonly used after electroplating, although it is not always fully effective because a sufficient time and temperature must be reached. Tests such as ASTM F1624 can be used to identify the minimum baking time and to verify process adequacy.

In the case of welding, pre-heating and post-heating are often applied to allow hydrogen to diffuse out before it can cause damage. This is especially relevant for high-strength steels and low alloy steels such as chromium/molybdenum/vanadium alloys. Because hydrogen atoms require time to recombine into molecules, hydrogen cracking due to welding may occur more than 24 hours after welding is completed.

Another way of reducing susceptibility is through appropriate materials selection. This can provide inherent resistance and reduce the need for post-processing or constant monitoring. Extensive work has been carried out to catalogue the compatibility of metals with hydrogen environments.

=== Hydrogen embrittlement in power generation equipment ===
Hydrogen embrittlement is considered an important degradation mechanism in power generation equipment operating in hydrogen-containing environments. Structural steels used in turbines, generators, pipelines and pressure vessels may experience hydrogen-assisted cracking, loss of ductility and accelerated fatigue damage during long-term service. In hydrogen-cooled turbo generators, hydrogen ingress into rotor steels and retaining ring materials has been associated with crack initiation and propagation under cyclic mechanical stresses. The susceptibility of steels to hydrogen-assisted degradation depends on microstructure, stress state, hydrogen concentration and environmental conditions. Various mitigation approaches, including surface coatings, optimized alloy design and hydrogen permeation barriers, have been proposed to reduce hydrogen-related damage in energy systems.

=== Surface coatings ===
Coatings act as a barrier between the metal substrate and the surrounding environment, hindering the ingress of hydrogen atoms. Various techniques can be used to apply coatings, such as electroplating, chemical conversion coatings, or organic coatings. The choice of coating depends on the type of metal, the operating environment, and the application requirements.

Electroplating is commonly used to deposit a protective layer onto the metal surface. This process involves immersing the metal substrate in an electrolyte solution containing metal ions. By applying an electric current, the metal ions are reduced and form a metallic coating on the substrate. Electroplating can improve corrosion resistance and reduce susceptibility to hydrogen embrittlement.

Chemical conversion coatings are another effective method for surface protection. These coatings are formed through chemical reactions between the metal substrate and a chemical solution, resulting in a thin, tightly adhering protective layer. Examples include chromate, phosphate, and oxide coatings.

Organic coatings, such as paints or polymer coatings, provide additional protection by forming a physical barrier between the metal surface and the environment.

Thermally sprayed coatings can also help reduce hydrogen ingress because coating materials such as ceramics or cermets may have low hydrogen permeability.

Thin hard coatings deposited by physical vapor deposition (PVD), including transition-metal nitrides such as titanium nitride (TiN), chromium nitride (CrN) and multilayer nanostructured coatings, have also been investigated as protective barriers against hydrogen-assisted degradation. Such coatings may reduce hydrogen uptake by modifying surface diffusion processes and improving wear resistance under sliding or rolling contact conditions. Experimental studies have shown that dense nitride coatings can significantly influence surface mechanical behavior, tribological performance and environmental resistance of steels and alloys operating in aggressive media.

== Testing ==
Most analytical methods for hydrogen embrittlement involve evaluating the effects of internal hydrogen from production and/or external hydrogen from service environments such as cathodic protection. For steels, it is important to test specimens in the laboratory that are at least as hard as the final parts.

There are numerous ASTM standards for testing hydrogen embrittlement:

- ASTM B577 – Standard Test Methods for Detection of Cuprous Oxide (Hydrogen Embrittlement Susceptibility) in Copper.
- ASTM B839 – Standard Test Method for Residual Embrittlement in Metallic Coated, Externally Threaded Articles, Fasteners, and Rods.
- ASTM F519 – Standard Test Method for Mechanical Hydrogen Embrittlement Evaluation of Plating/Coating Processes and Service Environments.
- ASTM F1459 – Standard Test Method for Determination of the Susceptibility of Metallic Materials to Hydrogen Gas Embrittlement (HGE) Test.
- ASTM G142 – Standard Test Method for Determination of Susceptibility of Metals to Embrittlement in Hydrogen Containing Environments at High Pressure, High Temperature, or Both.
- ASTM F1624 – Standard Test Method for Measurement of Hydrogen Embrittlement Threshold in Steel by the Incremental Step Loading Technique.
- ASTM F1940 – Standard Test Method for Process Control Verification to Prevent Hydrogen Embrittlement in Plated or Coated Fasteners.

Other related standards include:

- NACE TM0284 – Resistance to Hydrogen-Induced Cracking
- ISO 11114-4 – Transportable gas cylinders — Compatibility of cylinder and valve materials with gas contents — Part 4: Test methods for selecting metallic materials resistant to hydrogen embrittlement

== Notable failures from hydrogen embrittlement ==
- In 2013, six months prior to opening, the East Span of the San Francisco–Oakland Bay Bridge experienced catastrophic failures in shear bolts during testing, after only two weeks of service. The failure was attributed to hydrogen embrittlement.
- In the City of London, 122 Leadenhall Street, generally known as the Cheesegrater, suffered from hydrogen embrittlement in steel bolts, with several bolts breaking and falling in 2014 and 2015.

== See also ==
- Hydrogen analyzer
- Hydrogen damage
- Hydrogen piping
- Hydrogen safety
- Low hydrogen annealing
- Nascent hydrogen
- Oxygen-free copper
- Stress corrosion cracking
- White etching cracks
