= Hydrogen odorant =

Hydrogen gas safety feature

A hydrogen odorant in any form, is a minute amount of odorant such as ethyl isobutyrate, with a rotting-cabbage-like smell, that is added to the otherwise colorless and almost odorless hydrogen gas, so that leaks can be detected before a fire or explosion occurs. Odorants are considered non-toxic in the extremely low concentrations occurring in hydrogen gas delivered to the end user.

The approach is not new, for the same safety reasons the odorant tert-butyl mercaptan is used in natural gas.

== See also ==
- Hydrogen safety
- Odor detection threshold
