= Chrysler Natrium =

Overview
- Manufacturer: Chrysler (DaimlerChrysler)
- Production: 2001

Body and chassis
- Class: Minivan
- Body style: 4-door minivan
- Platform: Chrysler RS

The Chrysler Natrium was a hybrid fuel cell-type hydrogen vehicle based on the Chrysler Town and Country. It was showcased by Chrysler in 2001.

The Natrium was powered by a battery pack and a fuel cell using hydrogen produced by a sodium borohydride reformer inside the car. Because the reactant (sodium borohydride, NaBH_{4}) contained no carbon, the vehicle produced no carbon dioxide. It had a range of 300 miles (480 km), similar interior space to a standard van, and could produce 110 or 240 volt alternating current.

== Name ==
"Natrium" is the Latin name of sodium, a salt of which, sodium borohydride, is used in the car's fuel cell.

== Sources ==
- V. Hovland, A. Pesaran, R. Mohring, I.Eason, R. Schaller, D. Tran, T. Smith, G. Smith, “Water and Heat Balance in a Fuel Cell Vehicle With a Sodium Borohydride Hydrogen Fuel Processor.” Society of Automotive Engineer Technical paper 2003-01-2271.
- A Schell, H. Peng, D. Tran, E. Stamos, C.C. Lin, M.J. Kim. “Modeling and control strategy development for fuel cell electric vehicles.” Annual Reviews in Control 29 (2005) 159–168.
