= Hydrogen leak testing =

Hydrogen leak testing is the normal way in which a hydrogen pressure vessel or installation is checked for leaks or flaws. This usually involves charging hydrogen as a tracer gas into the device undergoing testing, with any leaking gas detected by hydrogen sensors. Various test mechanisms have been devised.

== Test mechanisms ==
=== Hydrostatic test ===
In the hydrostatic test, a vessel is filled with a nearly incompressible liquid – usually water or oil – and examined for leaks or permanent changes in shape. The test pressure is always considerably higher than the operating pressure to give a margin for safety, typically 150% of the operating pressure.

=== Burst test ===
In the burst test, a vessel is filled with a gas and tested for leaks. The test pressure is always considerably more than the operating pressure to give a margin for safety, typically 200% or more of the operating pressure.

=== Helium leak test ===
Using hardware setups similar to hydrogen leak testing, the helium leak test uses helium (the lightest inert gas) as a tracer gas instead of hydrogen and detects it in concentrations as small as one part in 10 million. The helium is selected primarily because it penetrates small leaks readily, is inert and will not react with the test piece while having a naturally low quantity (<6ppm) in air making detection of any amount less complicated. It is possible to detect leaks as small as 5 × 10^{−10} Pa·m^{3}/s in vacuum mode and modern digital machines can detect 5 × 10^{−10} Pa·m^{3}/s in sniffing mode.

=== Vacuum test ===
Usually a vacuum inside the object is created with an external pump connected to the instrument. Alternatively helium can be injected inside the product while the product itself is enclosed in a vacuum chamber connected to the instrument. In this case, burst and leakage tests can be combined in one operation.

=== Hydrogen sensor test ===
During the hydrogen sensor test, the object is filled with a mixture of 5% hydrogen/ 95% nitrogen, (below 5.7% hydrogen) is non-flammable (ISO-10156). This is called typically a sniffing test. The handprobe connected to the microelectronic hydrogen sensors is used to check the object. An audiosignal increases in proximity of a leak. Detection of leaks go down to 5 × 10^{−7} cubic centimeters per second. Compared to the helium test, hydrogen is cheaper than helium, no need for a vacuum, the instrument could be cheaper but is not as sensitive as a helium leak detector so will not find smaller leaks.

Chemo-chromic hydrogen leak detectors are materials that can be proactively applied to a connection or fitting. In the event of a hydrogen leak, the chemo-chromic material changes color to alert an inspector that a leak is present. Chemo-chromic indicators can also be added to silicone tapes for hydrogen detection purposes.

== See also ==
- Hydrogen analyzer
- Hydrogen piping
- Hydrogen safety
- Hydrogen station
- Tracer-gas leak testing method
- Tubing (material)
