= Hydrogen sensor =

Gas Detector

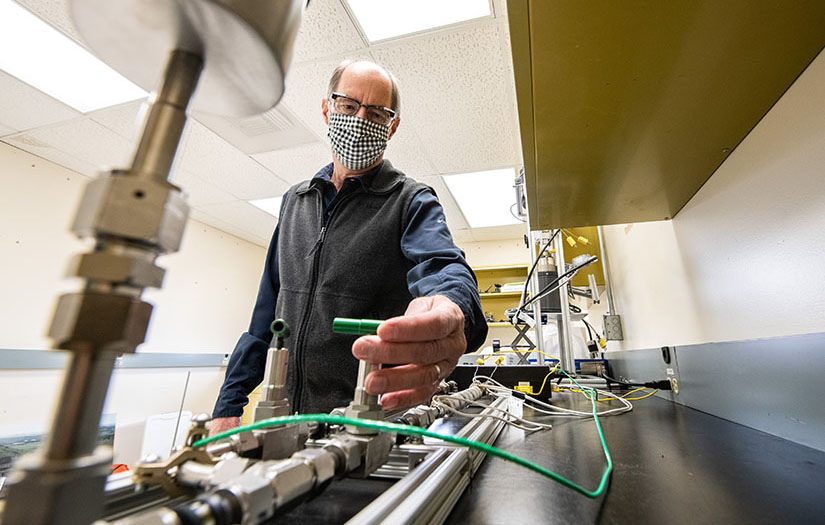
Greg Glatzmaier, at the National Renewable Energy Laboratory, determines the high-temperature thermal and mechanical stability of sealants used in a lab prototype of the integrated hydrogen sensor separator module.

A hydrogen sensor is a gas detector that detects the presence of hydrogen. They contain micro-fabricated point-contact hydrogen sensors and are used to locate hydrogen leaks. They are considered low-cost, compact, durable, and easy to maintain as compared to conventional gas detecting instruments.

== Key issues ==
There are five key issues with hydrogen detectors:

- Reliability: Functionality should be easily verifiable.
- Performance: Detection 0.5% hydrogen in air or better
- Response time < 1 second.
- Lifetime: At least the time between scheduled maintenance.
- Cost: Goal is $5 per sensor and $30 per controller.

=== Additional requirements ===
- Measurement range coverage of 0.1–10.0% concentration
- Operation in temperatures of −30 °C to 80 °C
- Accuracy within 5% of full scale
- Function in an ambient air gas environment within a 10–98% relative humidity range
- Resistance to hydrocarbon and other interference.
- Lifetime greater than 10 years

== Types of microsensors ==
There are various types of hydrogen microsensors, which use different mechanisms to detect the gas. Palladium is used in many of these, because it selectively absorbs hydrogen gas and forms the compound palladium hydride. Palladium-based sensors have a strong temperature dependence which makes their response time too large at very low temperatures. Palladium sensors have to be protected against carbon monoxide, sulfur dioxide and hydrogen sulfide.

=== Optical fibre hydrogen sensors ===
Several types of optical fibre surface plasmon resonance (SPR) sensor are used for the point-contact detection of hydrogen:

- Fiber Bragg grating coated with a palladium layer – Detects the hydrogen by metal hindrance.
- Micromirror – With a palladium thin layer at the cleaved end, detecting changes in the backreflected light.
- Tapered fibre coated with palladium – Hydrogen changes the refractive index of the palladium, and consequently the amount of losses in the evanescent wave.

=== Other types ===
- Electrochemical hydrogen sensor – low (ppm) levels of hydrogen gas can be sensed using electrochemical sensors which comprise an array of electrodes packaged so as to be surrounded by a conductive electrolyte and gas ingress controlled with a diffusion limited capillary.
- MEMS hydrogen sensor – The combination of nanotechnology and microelectromechanical systems (MEMS) technology allows the production of a hydrogen microsensor that functions properly at room temperature. One type of MEMS-based hydrogen sensor is coated with a film consisting of nanostructured indium oxide (In_{2}O_{3}) and tin oxide (SnO_{2}). A typical configuration for mechanical Pd-based hydrogen sensors is the usage of a free-standing cantilever that is coated with Pd. In the presence of H_{2}, the Pd layer expands and thereby induces a stress that causes the cantilever to bend. Pd-coated nanomechanical resonators have also been reported in literature, relying on the stress-induced mechanical resonance frequency shift caused by the presence of H_{2} gas. In this case, the response speed was enhanced through the use of a very thin layer of Pd (20 nm). Moderate heating was presented as a solution to the response impairment observed in humid conditions.
- Thin film sensor – A palladium thin film sensor is based on an opposing property that depends on the nanoscale structures within the thin film. In the thin film, nanosized palladium particles swell when the hydride is formed, and in the process of expanding, some of them form new electrical connections with their neighbors. The resistance decreases because of the increased number of conducting pathways.
- Thick film sensors – devices usually having two principal components:1) a thick (hundreds of microns) layer of some semiconductor material (SnO_{2}, In_{2}O_{3}), called "matrix" and an upper layer of catalytically active additives like noble metals (Pd, Pt) and metal oxides (Co_{x}O_{y}) accelerating the hydrogen oxidation reaction on the surface, which makes the sensor response much faster. The role of "matrix" is to transduce the signal to the measurement system. Thick film sensors are more stable than thin film sensors in terms of signal drifting, but generally exhibit slower sensor response due to diffusion constraints into a thick layer. Thick film sensor technology is getting substituted by thin film approaches due to the increasing need for sensor integration into modern electronic systems. Thick film sensors require increased temperatures for their operation and therefore appear to be poorly compatible with digital electronics systems.
- Chemochromic hydrogen sensors – Reversible and irreversible chemochromic hydrogen sensors include a smart pigment paint that visually identifies hydrogen leaks by a change in color. The sensor is also available as tape. Other methods have been developed to assay biological hydrogen production.
- Diode based Schottky sensor – A Schottky diode-based hydrogen gas sensor employs a palladium-alloy gate. Hydrogen can be selectively absorbed in the gate, lowering the Schottky energy barrier. A Pd/InGaP metal-semiconductor (MS) Schottky diode can detect a concentration of 15 parts per million (ppm) H_{2} in air. Silicon carbide semiconductor or silicon substrates are used.
- Metallic La-Mg2-Ni which is electrical conductive, absorbs hydrogen near ambient conditions, forming the nonmetallic hydride LaMg2NiH7 an insulator.

Sensors are typically calibrated at the manufacturing factory and are valid for the service life of the unit.

=== Enhancement ===
Siloxane enhances the sensitivity and reaction time of hydrogen sensors. Detection of hydrogen levels as low as 25 ppm can be achieved; far below hydrogen's lower explosive limit of around 40,000 ppm.

== See also ==
- Hydrogen analyzer
- Hydrogen leak testing
- Hydrogen safety
- Katharometer
- List of sensors
- Optical fiber
- Zinc oxide nanorod sensor
