= Hydrogen therapy =

Use of molecular hydrogen for therapeutic purposes

Hydrogen therapy is the use of molecular hydrogen (H_{2}) for therapeutic purposes. Hydrogen therapy’s efficacy has not been established; it may help treat neurological disorders by reducing oxidative stress and inflammation, though optimal dosing and targets remain unclear. H_{2} is being researched for age-related disease.

== Research ==
H₂ is proposed to reduce oxidative stress and modulate inflammatory and gene expression pathways, but definitive large-scale clinical evidence of therapeutic efficacy is limited.

H₂ may reduce oxidative stress and influence aging-related pathways, with potential to prevent or treat age-related diseases, though clinical evidence is limited.

It may offer protective benefits in spinal cord injury; clinical evidence is preliminary.

It may protect the liver through antioxidant and anti-inflammatory effects, though clinical evidence is still emerging.

It may improve cardiometabolic health through antioxidant and regulatory effects, though clinical evidence is limited.
