= Low hydrogen annealing =

Heat treatment in metallurgy

Low hydrogen annealing, commonly known as "baking" is a heat treatment in metallurgy for the reduction or elimination of hydrogen in a material to prevent hydrogen embrittlement. Hydrogen embrittlement is the hydrogen-induced cracking of metals, particularly steel which results in degraded mechanical properties such as plasticity, ductility and fracture toughness at low temperature. Low hydrogen annealing is called a de-embrittlement process. Low hydrogen annealing is an effective method compared to alternatives such as electroplating the material with zinc to provide a barrier for hydrogen ingress which results in coating defects.

The underlying mechanism for hydrogen embrittlement is different for the surface compared to hydrogen penetrated into the bulk of the solid. Studies have shown that annealing at 200 °C weakens hydrogen embrittlement caused by internal hydrogen but has little effect on surface-absorbed hydrogen. At 200 °C, hydrogen atoms can diffuse out of iron and partial stainless steel and is the minimum temperature needed for the process. The exact mechanism or its effects are not fully understood because it is also hypothesized that 200 °C allows for vacancy elimination in the solid which can affect its mechanical properties too.

== Process description ==
The material is kept in a hydrogen annealing oven over several hours at temperatures between 200 °C and 300 °C. The enclosed hydrogen atoms, known for hydrogen embrittlement are removed by effusion. The method is predominantly used immediately after welding, coating process or galvanizing of the parts.

== Effect on mechanical properties ==
Zhou et al. show the comparison of stress-strain curves of the unannealed X80 pipeline steel and specimens that were annealed at 200 °C for 12 hr. The stress-strain curve changes significantly. The yield phenomena appeared in the stress-strain curve after annealing. This can be explained as the following. At 200 °C, carbon atoms have sufficient energy to diffuse into the interstitial sites of dislocations forming Cottrell atmosphere. This pins dislocations in place and reduces the density of movable dislocations. In unannealed samples, the large density of movable dislocations ae activated and yield does not occur because no drastic change in dislocation density takes place. The yield strength increased by approximately 10% and the elongation decreased by approximately 20%. Finally, based on the testing environments, it can be concluded that annealing at 200 °C decreases internal hydrogen embrittlement but is ineffective for hydrogen embrittlement susceptibility caused by surface absorbed hydrogen.

== Effect on lattice ==
The type of lattice defects are related to the activation energy for release of the trapped hydrogen. Hydrogen atoms can escape from defects and move into lattice interstitials. Diffusion between such types of sites can reach a dynamic equilibrium.

== See also ==
- Annealing (metallurgy)
- Tempering
