= Homefueler =

Home hydrogen station

Homefueler is a home hydrogen station. It uses single phase AC power and water for the pressurized alkaline electrolyzer to generate hydrogen, a diaphragm compressor handles a filling pressure of 5,000 psig (350 bar). Storage is 13 kg, daily production is 2 kg H_{2}. The hydrogen dispensing system is aimed at providing enough energy for 1 - 2 cars.

The system is tested by NFCRC University of California, Irvine and is based on the HyStat-A Energy Station.

== See also ==
- Hydrogen economy
