= Hydrogen analyzer =

Device

A hydrogen analyzer is measurement instrument used to determine the concentration of hydrogen in gases, liquids or solid materials. It is used in industrial processes, energy systems, laboratory analysis and metallurgical applications such as hydrogen determination in steels and alloys.

Hydrogen analyzers are widely used in oil and gas, chemical processing, power generation and hydrogen production systems. Measurement performance depends on operating conditions such as pressure, temperature and the composition of the background gas, all of which can influence sensor response and accuracy.

A variety of measurement principles are used for hydrogen analysis, including thermal conductivity, electrochemical, catalytic and optical methods. Each technique has specific advantages and limitations depending on factors such as selectivity, measurement range, response time and environmental conditions.

In practical applications, hydrogen measurement is often integrated into process control and safety systems. Standards such as ISO 14687 define hydrogen quality requirements for specific uses, including fuel cell applications, while metrology initiatives led by national laboratories support the development of traceable and reliable measurement techniques.

== See also ==
- Hydrogen embrittlement
- Hydrogen leak testing
- Hydrogen sensor
