= Phase transformation crystallography =

Phase transformation crystallography describes the orientation relationship and interface orientation after a phase transformation (such as martensitic transformation or precipitation).
