= Fiat Phylla =

Concept car by the Italian car manufacture Fiat

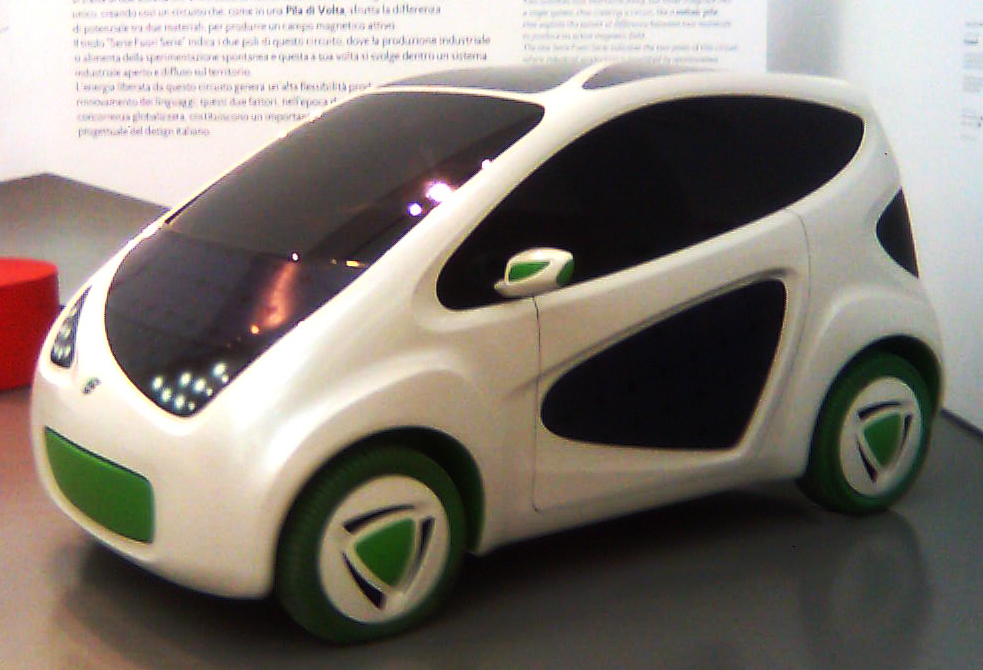
Fiat Phylla at Triennale Design Museum (Milan), 2009.

The Fiat Phylla concept car was unveiled in 2008 by the Italian car manufacture Fiat. Originally expected to form the basis of a production car in 2010, it remains a concept city car. The Phylla name means "leaves" in ancient Greek.

== Specification ==
The recyclable Phylla is powered by a 1kW hydrogen fuel cell and comes equipped with 340W of photovoltaic solar cells and weighs 750 kg (1,650 lb), 150 kg (330 lb) of which is batteries. The split-frame vehicle is made of a mix of aluminum and bioplastics. The compact four-seater car is 2,995 mm (117.9 in) long equipped with 15-inch wheels wrapped in green tyres. It accelerates to 30 mph (48.3 kmh) in less than 6.0 seconds and can reach a top speed of 81 mph (130 kph) with a peak output of 72 bhp (54 kW; 73 PS).

== Project team ==
The Phylla was developed by Centro Ricerche Fiat (which as vehicle project leader was responsible for the technical and architectural decisions involved in developing the demonstrator vehicle) in combination with the Piedmont regional administration (which sponsored and funded and the project), the Environment Park (which helped define and select innovative technologies for the environment) and the Politecnico di Torino (responsible for the overall management of the project and coordination of the partners).
