= Peugeot Quark =

Peugeot Quark Concept
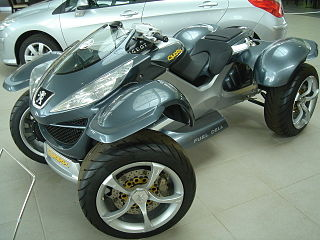

Overview
- Manufacturer: Peugeot
- Production: 2004 (concept car)

Body and chassis
- Body style: Concept (all-terrain vehicle)
- Layout: Dual-motors four-wheel drive

Powertrain
- Engine: 28 kW (38 PS; 38 hp) Hydrogen Fuel-cell (engine)
- Electric motor: 4x electric wheel-hub motors
- Transmission: single speed

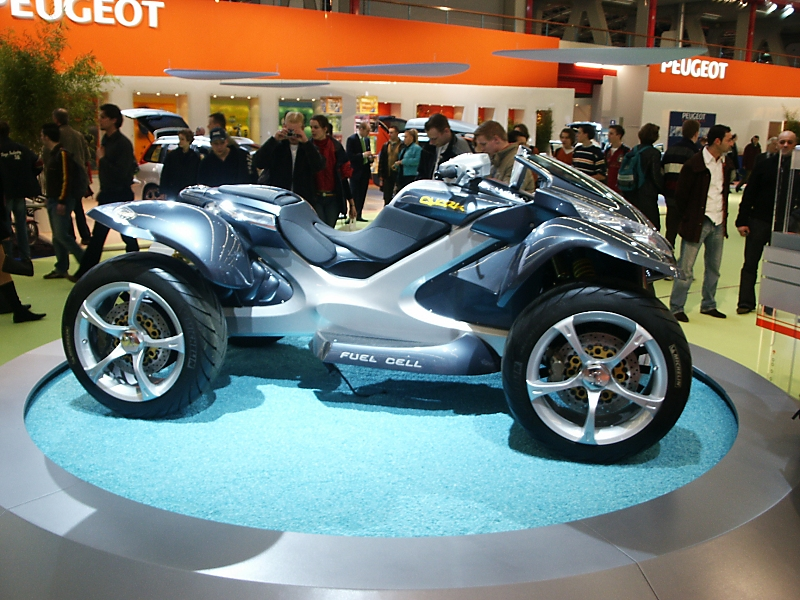
The Quark at the February 2005 Amsterdam Motor Show

The Peugeot Quark was a concept car from Peugeot, similar to a four-wheeled motorcycle or a quad bike. The Quark was unveiled at the 2004 Paris Motor Show and subsequently shown at the 2005 Amsterdam Motor Show.

It utilised hydrogen fuel cells and had an electric motor on each wheel. All four motors combined gave the Quark 28 kW (38 hp). It could drive approximately 130 kilometres (81 mi) before requiring refuelling. The Quark was 2.38 metres (94 in) long and 1.50 metres (59 in) wide. Its empty weight was 450 kg (992 lb) and its top speed is 110 km/h (68 mph).

It was able to accelerate to 50 km/h (31 mph) in 6.5 seconds, and could carry two people with an additional load of 140 kg (309 lb). The Quark was not intended for production and can now be seen in Paris at the Cité des Sciences et de l'Industrie.
