= Peugeot 1007 =

Small MPV produced by Peugeot (2004-2009)

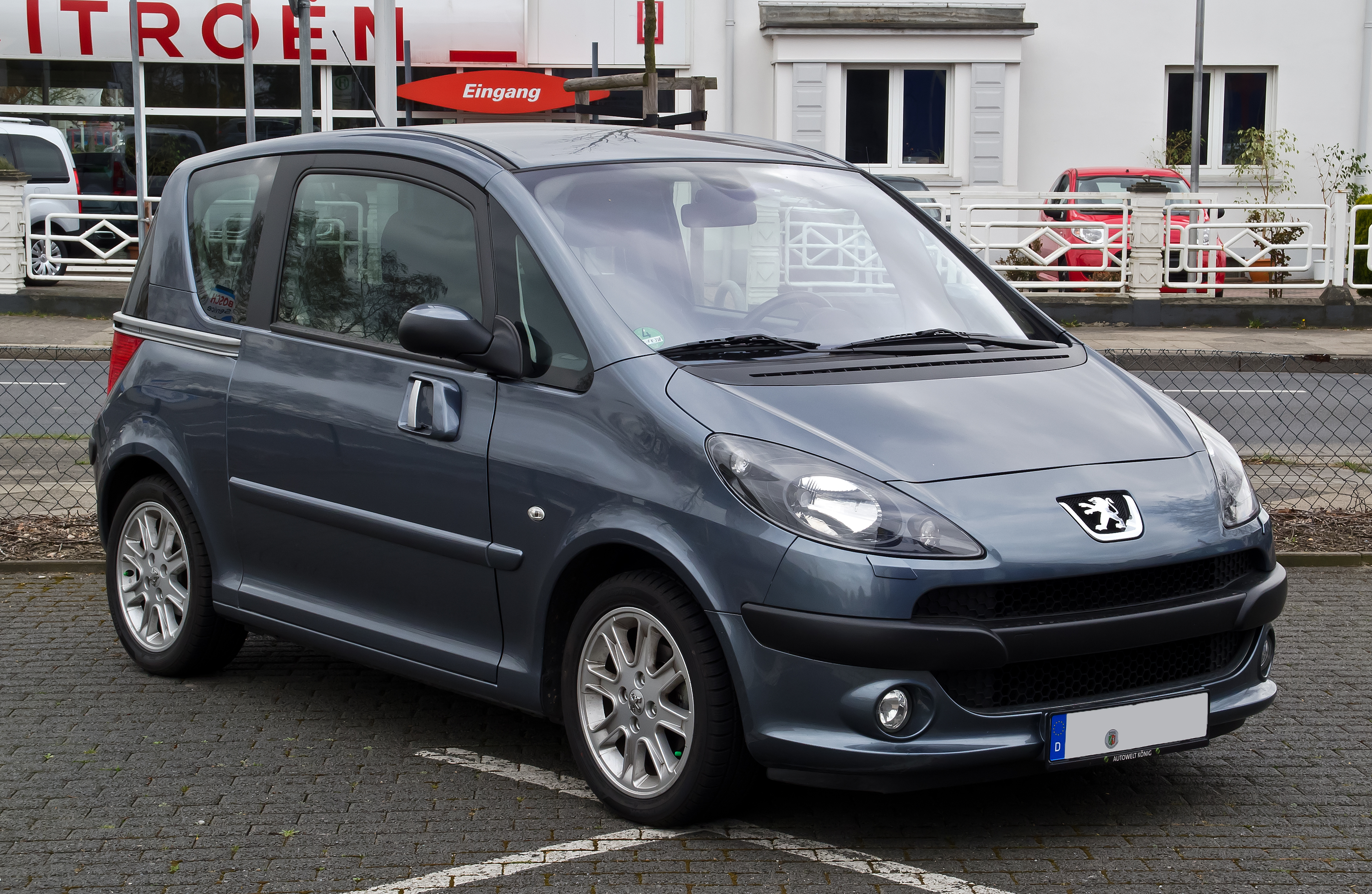

Overview
- Manufacturer: Peugeot (PSA Group)
- Production: 2004–2009
- Assembly: France: Poissy (Poissy Plant)
- Designer: Pininfarina

Body and chassis
- Class: Supermini/City car
- Body style: 3-door hatchback
- Layout: Front-engine, front-wheel-drive
- Doors: Sliding
- Related: Citroën C2; Citroën C3; Peugeot 206

Powertrain
- Engine: Petrol: 1.4 L TU3 I4 8V; 1.4 L ET3 I4 16V; 1.6 L TU5 I4 16V; Diesel: 1.4 L PSA DV4 HDi I4 8V; 1.6 L PSA DV6 HDi I4 16V

Dimensions
- Wheelbase: 2,315 mm (91.1 in)
- Length: 3,731 mm (146.9 in)
- Width: 1,826 mm (71.9 in)
- Height: 1,620 mm (63.8 in)
- Curb weight: 1,291 kg (2,846 lb)

Chronology
- Successor: Peugeot 107

The Peugeot 1007 is a small three-door car manufactured by Peugeot from 2004 to 2009, noted for its user-swappable interior trim pieces and its four pillar design incorporating two power sliding doors. It shares its platform with the Peugeot 206, Citroën C2 and Citroën C3. Sales commenced in April 2005 in Europe.

== Background ==
The 1007 is the production version of the Sésame concept, which was presented at the 2002 Paris Motor Show.

The car featured the optional "2-Tronic" automated manual transmission, also used (under the name "Sensodrive") on the Citroën's C2, C3 and C3 Pluriel which shares the 206's 1.4 L and 1.6 L petrol engines and 1.4 L and 1.6 L diesel engines.

For its size, the 1007 was expensive, with prices around €14,000 / £10,000. Euro NCAP awarded the vehicle its second best ever rating for adult occupant safety. It has been described as a supermini, an urban hatchback, a city car, and a small car, while some of the 1007's features have been compared to those of multi-purpose vehicles (MPVs). The vehicle was generally described as a petit monospace, minispace (small MPV) or microspace (smaller small MPV) by French press. Pininfarina, the studio that designed the 1007, described it as an MPV. Peugeot referred to the 1007 as a berline monocorps (one-box car).

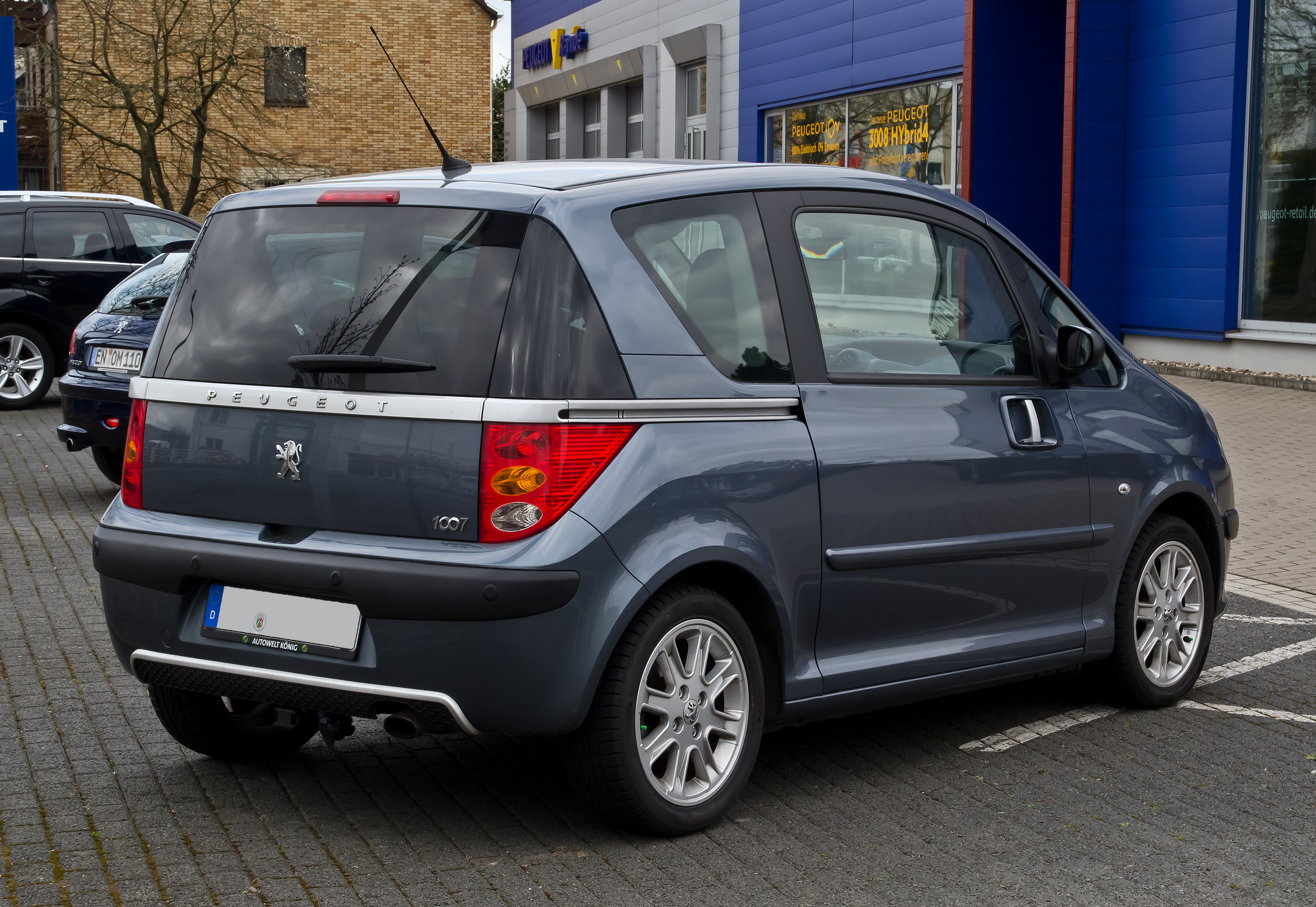
Rear view

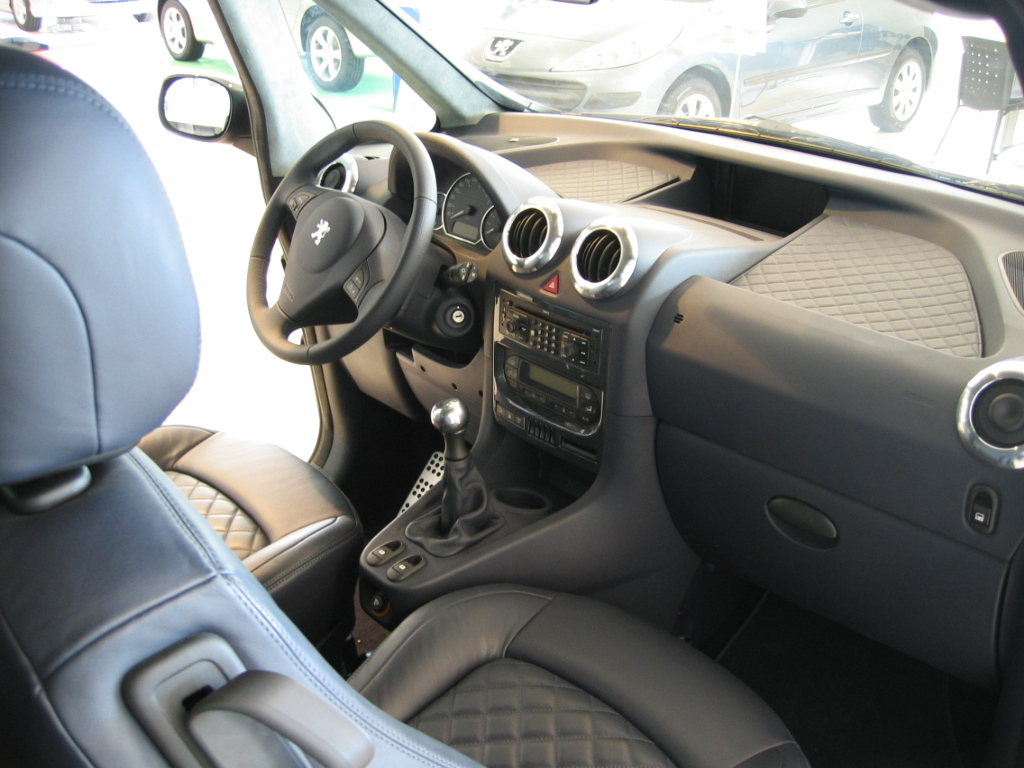
Interior

== Features ==
The 1007 is the first mainstream car from Peugeot to feature a "double zero" number. In English speaking countries, the name was marketed with the pronunciation "ten oh seven".

Originally launched with the pronunciation, "one double oh seven", and James Bond style promotion, Peugeot revised their strategy, under pressure from the Bond franchise owners. It is also commonly called the "one thousand and seven". In France, it was marketed as the "mille sept".

== Discontinuation in Europe ==
The 1007 was dropped from Peugeot's model line up in the United Kingdom in 2008, although the car was still in production in mainland Europe until the end of 2009.

== Reception ==
Although the concept car received good reception from the public, once in production, the 1007 was regarded as one of Peugeot's largest sales failures. Overall, due to poor sales, Peugeot lost an estimated €15,380 per vehicle produced.

== Engines ==
Petrol engines
Model	Engine	Displacement cc (ci)	Power	Torque	0–100 km/h,s	Top speed km/h (mph)	Transmission	CO_{2} emission (g/km)
1.4 L	TU3 I4	1,360 (83)	55 kW; 74 bhp (75 PS)	89 N⋅m (66 lb⋅ft)	14.4	165 km/h (103 mph)	TBA	153
1.4 L	ET3 I4 16V	1,360 (83)	65 kW; 87 bhp (88 PS)	133 N⋅m (98 lb⋅ft)	13.6	173 km/h (107 mph)	TBA	153
1.6 L	TU5 I4 16V	1,587 (97)	81 kW; 108 bhp (110 PS)	110 N⋅m (81 lb⋅ft)	12.0	190 km/h (120 mph)	TBA	163
Diesel engines
1.4 L	DV4 HDi diesel I4	1,398 (85)	50 kW; 67 bhp (68 PS)	160 N⋅m (120 lb⋅ft)	15.4	160 km/h (99 mph)	TBA	115
1.6 L	DV6 HDi diesel I4	1,560 (95)	82 kW; 109 bhp (111 PS)	194 N⋅m (143 lb⋅ft)	10.6	185 km/h (115 mph)	TBA	125

== Sales ==
Year	Worldwide sales	Worldwide Production	Notes
2004	1,100	TBA	TBA
2005	53,800	TBA	TBA
2006	34,100	TBA	TBA
2007	18,600	TBA	TBA
2008	11,000	TBA	TBA
2009	5,200	4,800	TBA
2010	100	0	TBA

== Gallery ==
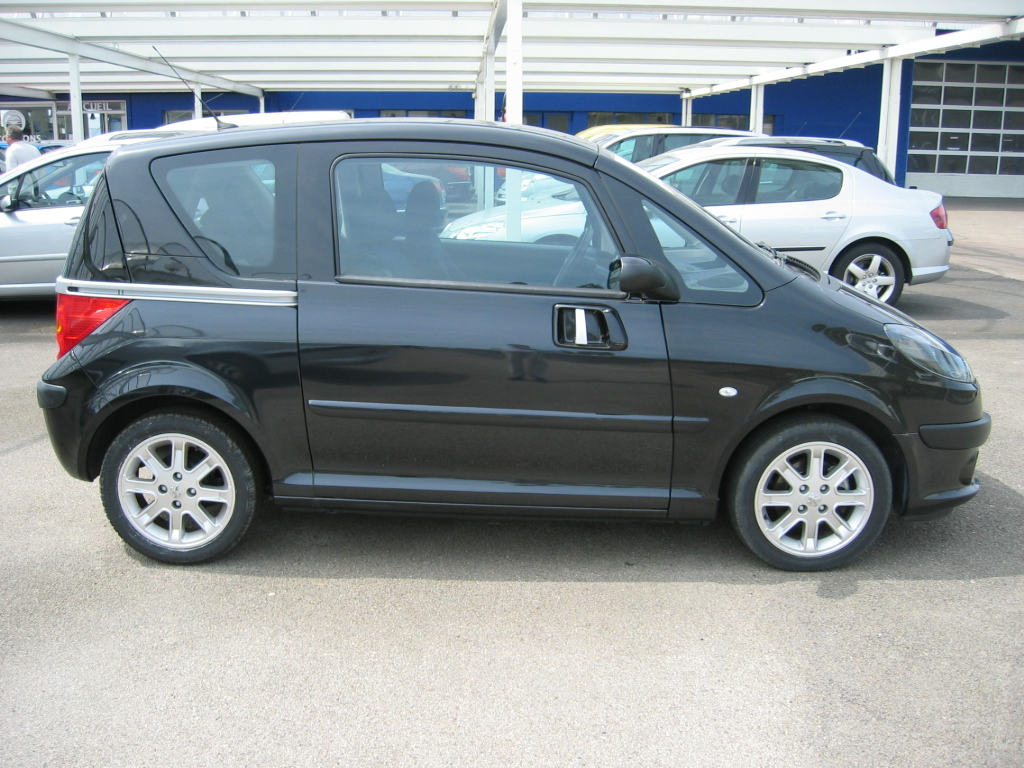
Side view

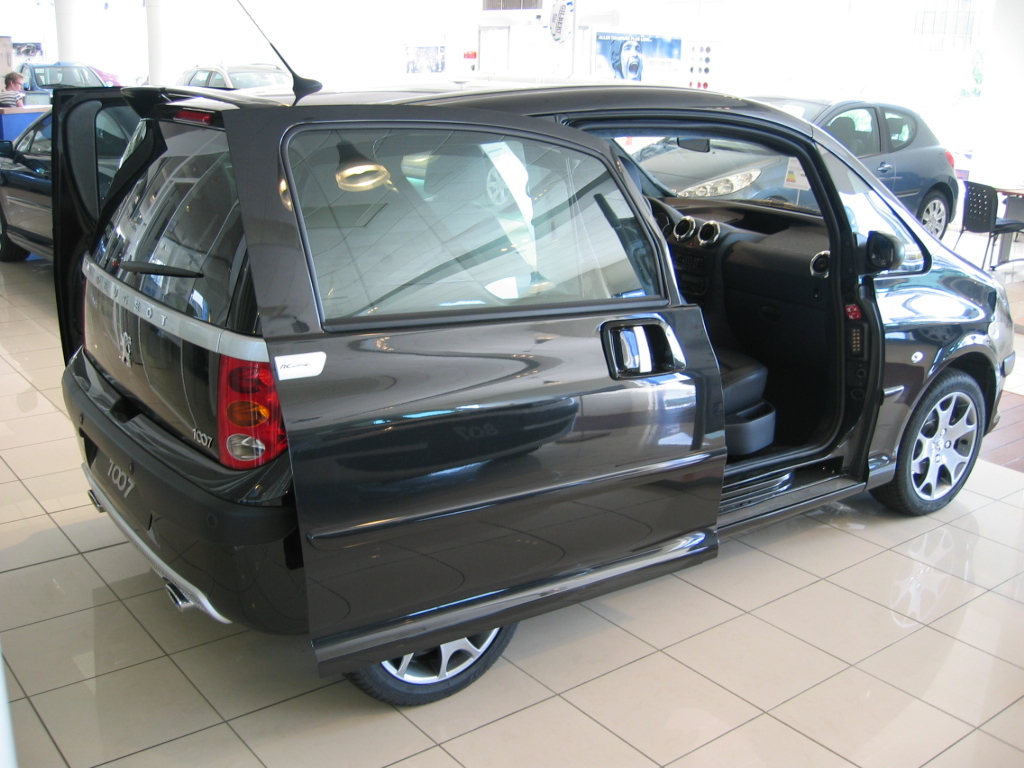
Door opened

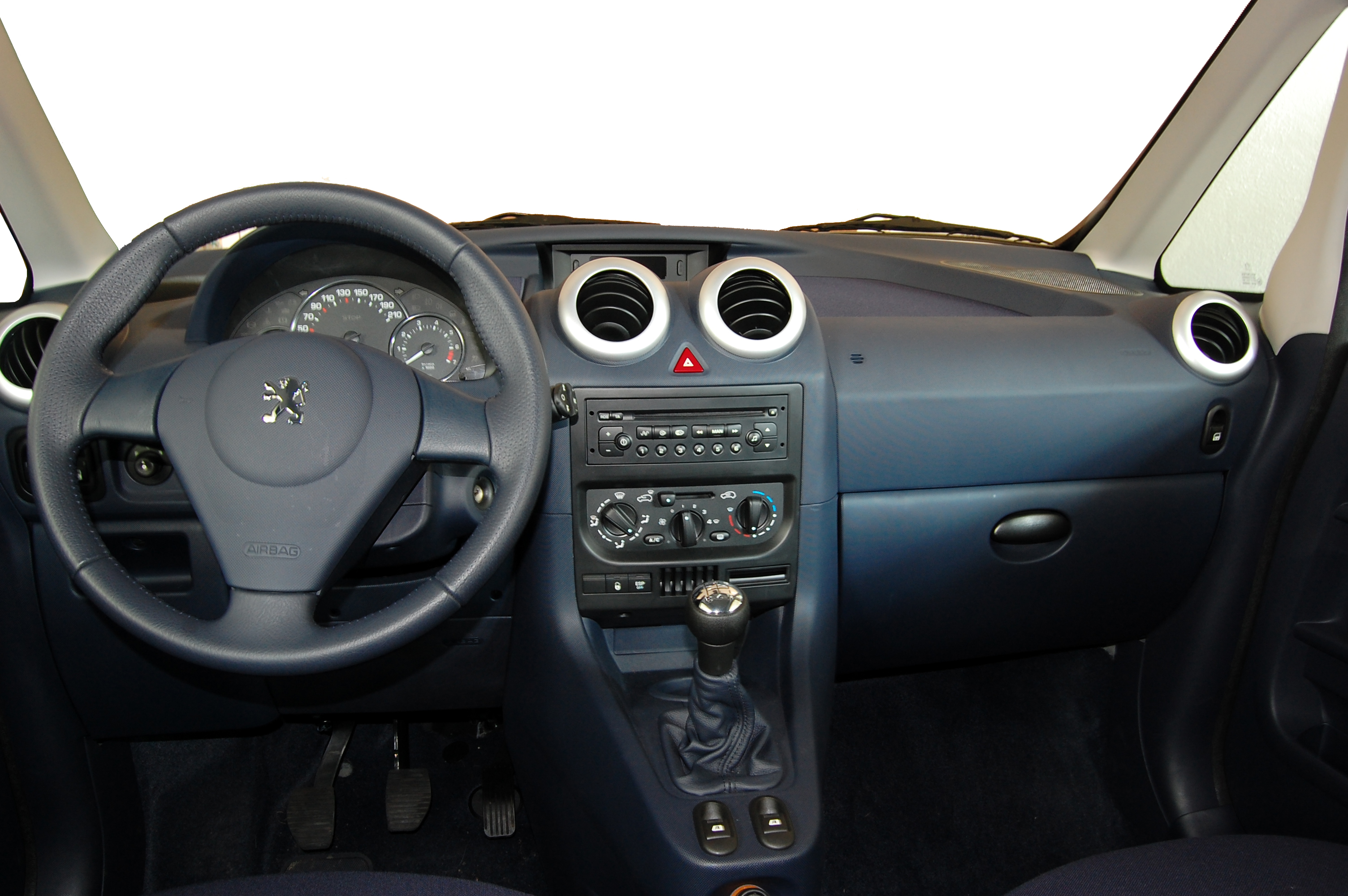
Interior

== See also ==
- Toyota Porte, similar class car with sliding side door
