= Type 14 =

Type 14 may refer to:

- Type 14 Nambu pistol, a Japanese pistol
- Blackwood-class frigate, a class of anti-submarine frigates of the Royal Navy
- Type 14 10 cm AA Gun, an anti-aircraft gun used by the Imperial Japanese Army
- Volkswagen Type 14A (Hebmüller Cabriolet), a German automobile
- Peugeot Type 14, a motor car by the French auto-maker Peugeot
- Type 14 10 cm Cannon, a cannon of the Imperial Japanese Army
- Hiro Type 14 (engine), a water-cooled twelve-cylinder W engine built by the Hiro Naval Arsenal

== See also ==
- Class 14 (disambiguation)
- T14 (disambiguation)
