= Class 14 =

Class 14 may refer to:

- The British Rail Class 14, a British diesel locomotive class
- C 14-class missile boat
- The DRG Class 14, a German steam locomotive class operated by the Deutsche Reichsbahn with a 4-4-2 ("Atlantic") wheel arrangement. These were the:
  - Class 14.0: Prussian S 8 and S 9
  - Class 14.0^{II}: BBÖ 308
  - Class 14.1: Palatine P 3, Palatine P 4 and Bavarian S 2/5
  - Class 14.2: Saxon X V
  - Class 14.3: Saxon X H1
- GER Class G14
- GNR Class J14
- GER Class Y14
- JNR Class DD14
- LNER Class C14
- LSWR C14 class
- LSWR E14 class
- LSWR G14 class
- LSWR P14 class
- LSWR T14 class
- Queensland A14 class locomotive
- South African Class 14E
- South African Class 14E1
- VR Class Dr14
- Watercat M14-class landing craft

== See also ==
- Type 14 (disambiguation)
