= T14 =

T14 may refer to:

== Aerospace ==
- T14 (satellite), a DirecTV communications satellite
- Slingsby T.14 Gull II, a British glider
- Soyuz T-14, the 9th expedition to Salyut 7
- Taylor Airport (Quinlan, Texas)

== Education ==
- Top 14 Law Schools, the fourteen most prestigious law schools in the United States

== Rail and transit ==
=== Lines ===
- Rhode Island Avenue–New Carrollton Line, of the Washington Metropolitan Area Transit Authority
- T14 line, of the Stockholm Metro
- Île-de-France tramway Line 14

=== Locomotives ===
- LSWR T14 class, a steam locomotive
- Prussian T 14, a steam locomotive

=== Stations ===
- Irinaka Station, Nagoya, Aichi Prefecture, Japan
- Nangō-Nana-Chōme Station, Sapporo, Hokkaido, Japan
- Nijōjō-mae Station, Kyoto, Japan
- Sembayashi-Omiya Station, Osaka, Japan
- Tōyōchō Station, Tokyo, Japan
- Tsuruwa Station, Sanuki, Kagawa Prefecture, Japan

== Weapons and armor ==
- Nambu T-14, a pistol
- Safir T-14, a shotgun
- T-14 Armata, a Russian main battle tank
- T14 heavy tank, a joint American and British project to develop a heavy tank
- T14 light tank, an American tankette

== Other uses ==
- Estonian national road 14
- T14 road (Tanzania)
- German torpedo boat T14
- Piper River language
- Sorex araneus coronavirus T14
- Throw stick (hieroglyph), an Egyptian hieroglyph
- Top Fourteen ranked law schools in the United States
- ThinkPad T14, a series of laptops manufactured by Lenovo
