= Île-de-France tramway Line 14 =

Tram line in Seine-et-Marne

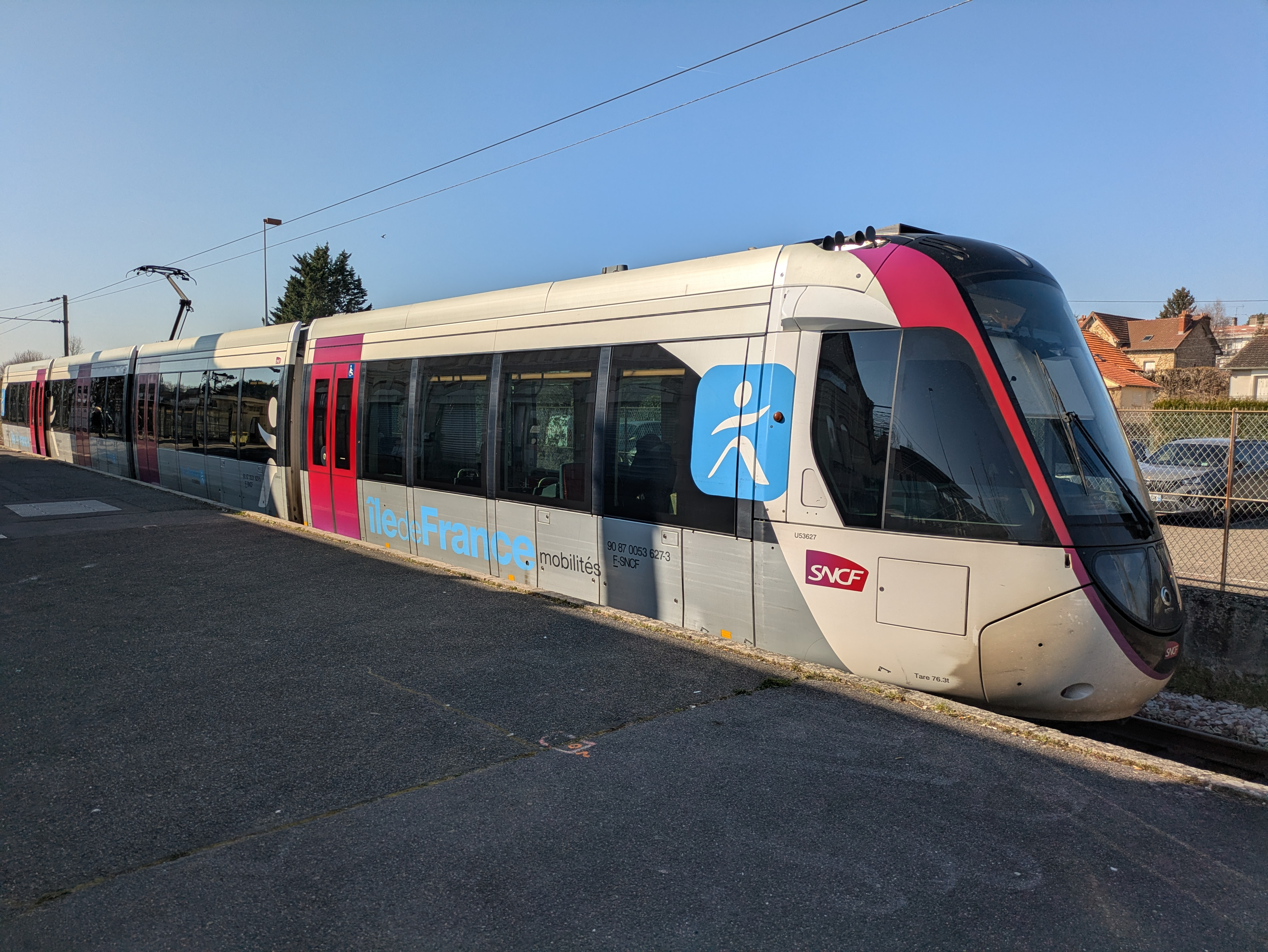
- Île-de-France tramway Line 14 at Crécy-la-Chapelle

Overview
- Owner: Île-de-France Mobilités
- Termini: Esbly; Crécy-la-Chapelle
- Stations: 5

Service
- Type: Tram-train
- System: Tramways in Île-de-France
- Operator: Stretto
- Rolling stock: Alstom Citadis Dualis
- Daily ridership: 1,000

History
- Opened: 1902; 124 years ago
- Separated from Transilien Line P: 22 March 2025

Technical
- Line length: 9.9 km (6.2 mi)
- Track gauge: 1,435 mm (4 ft 8 1/2 in) standard gauge
Route map

Île-de-France tramway Line 14 (T14; French: Ligne 14 du tramway d'Île-de-France) is a suburban tram-train line in Seine-et-Marne, east of Paris. The line, operated by Stretto (a consortium of Keolis and SNCF Voyageurs), runs along the Esbly–Crécy-la-Chapelle line between Esbly and Crécy-la-Chapelle.

The T14 was launched in March 2025, separating the Esbly–Crécy-la-Chapelle line from Transilien Line P: however, the line had been a self-contained tram-train service since July 2011, while it was part of the latter. It is the least used tramway line in Île-de-France, with around 1,000 passengers per day.

== History ==
The Esbly–Crécy-la-Chappelle line was opened in 1902.

The line was converted into a tram-train line with the introduction of the Siemens Avanto rolling stock on 4 July 2011. Due to reliability issues, it was replaced by the Alstom Citadis Dualis on 8 March 2022, following tests on 12 February.

Following a European Union decision, public transport in Île-de-France was opened to competition. One of the two contracts pertained to operating lines 4 and 11 of the Île-de-France tramway, and the Crécy-la-Chappelle–Esbly branch of Transilien Line P, which were allotted together as they used the same Dualis rolling stock and the same maintenance facilities in Noisy-le-Sec. It was awarded on 12 October 2023 to Stretto, a consortium of Keolis and SNCF Voyageurs created for that purpose. The move was criticized by the left-wing regional opposition, citing fears of degradation of service quality and of worse conditions for railway workers, who would fall under a different legal status.

In March 2025, Stretto began operating the Esbly–Crécy-la-Chapelle line, which was split from Transilien Line P as the new T14 line.

== Route and stations ==
Line 14 travels 9.9 kilometres (6.2 mi) from Esbly to Montry, Saint-Germain-sur-Morin, and Crécy-la-Chapelle. It serves five stations, all in fare zone 5.

List of T14 stations
Station	Image	Commune	Connections
Esbly		Esbly	Transilien Line P
Montry–Condé		Montry	
Couilly–Saint-Germain–Quincy		Saint-Germain-sur-Morin	
Villiers Montbarbin		Crécy-la-Chapelle	
Crécy-la-Chapelle		Crécy-la-Chapelle	
