= GNR Class J13 =

Class of 85 two-cylinder locomotives

GNR Class J13 LNER Class J52
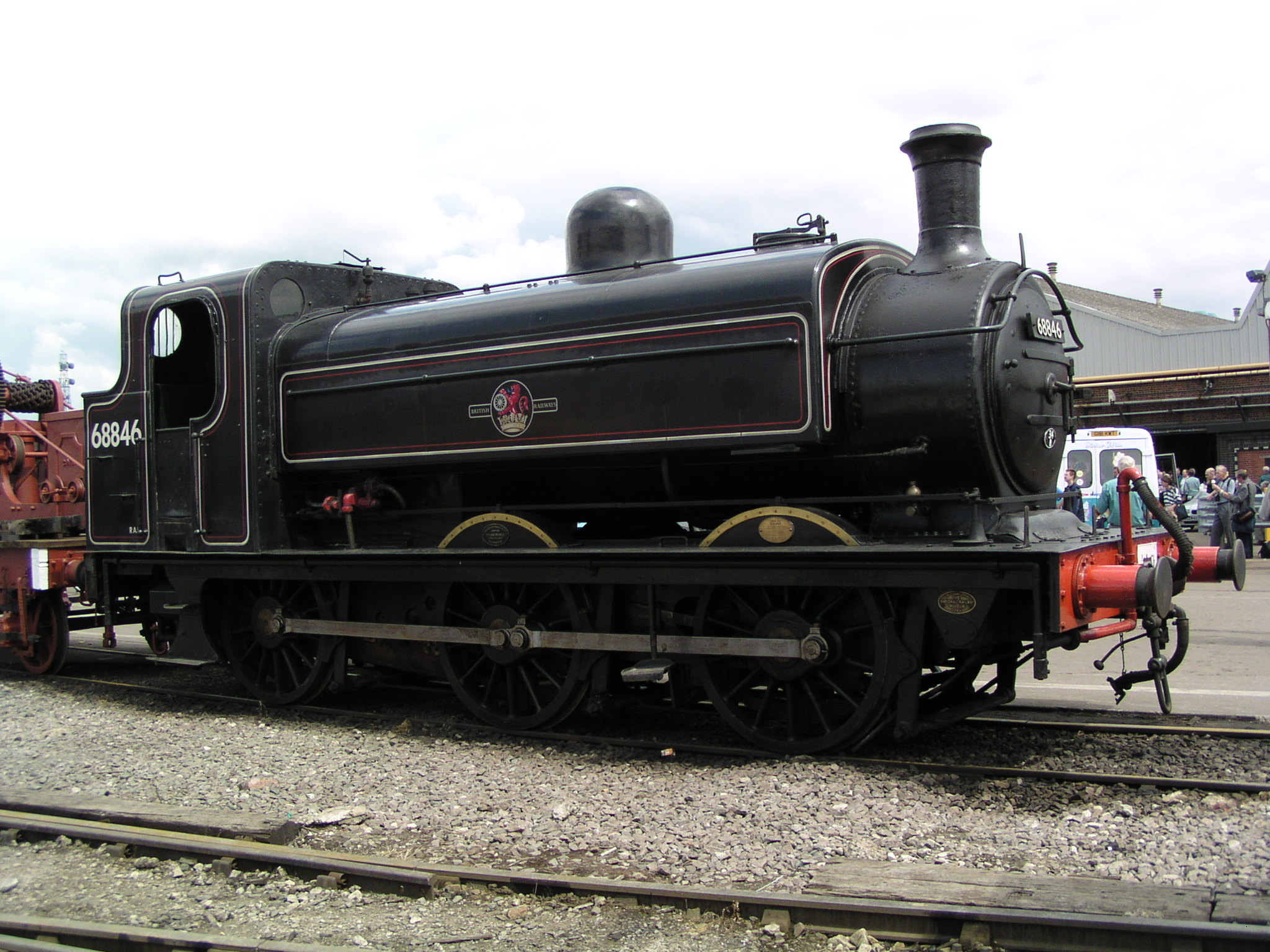
- Preserved 68846
Type and origin
- Power type: Steam
- Designer: Henry Ivatt
- Builder: Doncaster Works (50); Robert Stephenson & Co. (10); Sharp, Stewart & Co. (25)
- Build date: 1897–1909
- Total produced: 85
Specifications
- Configuration
  - Whyte: 0-6-0ST
  - UIC: C n2t
- Gauge: 4 ft 8 1/2 in (1,435 mm) standard gauge
- Driver dia.: 4 ft 8 in (1.422 m)
- Loco weight: 51.70 long tons (52.53 t; 57.90 short tons)
- Fuel type: Coal
- Water cap.: 1,100 imp gal (5,000 L; 1,300 US gal)
- Boiler pressure: 170 psi (1.17 MPa)
- Cylinders: Two, inside
- Cylinder size: 18 in × 26 in (457 mm × 660 mm)
Performance figures
- Tractive effort: 21,735 lbf (96.68 kN)
Career
- Operators: Great Northern Railway; London and North Eastern Railway; British Railways
- Class: GNR: J13; LNER: J52
- Power class: BR: 3F
- Withdrawn: 1936 - 1961
- Disposition: One preserved, remainder scrapped

The Great Northern Railway (GNR) Class J13, classified J52 by the LNER is a class of 0-6-0ST steam locomotive intended primarily for shunting.

The Class J13 were introduced in 1897 designed by Henry Ivatt based on the earlier domeless GNR Class J14 (LNER Class J53). Eighty-five J13s were built up to 1909. Several J14s were rebuilt as J13s from 1922.

== Sub-classes ==
Some locomotives were fitted with condensing apparatus for working on the Metropolitan Railway. Condensing apparatus was added to, or removed from, locomotives when they were allocated to, or away from, the London area.

The LNER reclassified the J13 as J52. They also introduced two subclasses, J52/1 for the rebuilt engines and J52/2 for the originals. Forty-eight J52/1s and eighty-five J52/2s passed to British Railways in 1948 and they were numbered 68757–68889.

== Accidents ==
On 20 May 1952, No. 68790 collided with an NCB locomotive.

== Preservation ==
One, 8846 was privately preserved by Captain Bill Smith in 1959 and became the first locomotive to be privately preserved from BR. In 1980 it was donated to the National Railway Museum and made regular visits to other preserved railways and museums on its two Boiler Ticket durations in preservation.

== Sources ==
- Ian Allan ABC of British Railways Locomotives (1948 ed.). part 4, pp. 50–51.
