= Crécy-la-Chapelle station =

Railway station in Crécy-la-Chapelle, France

Crécy-la-Chepelle
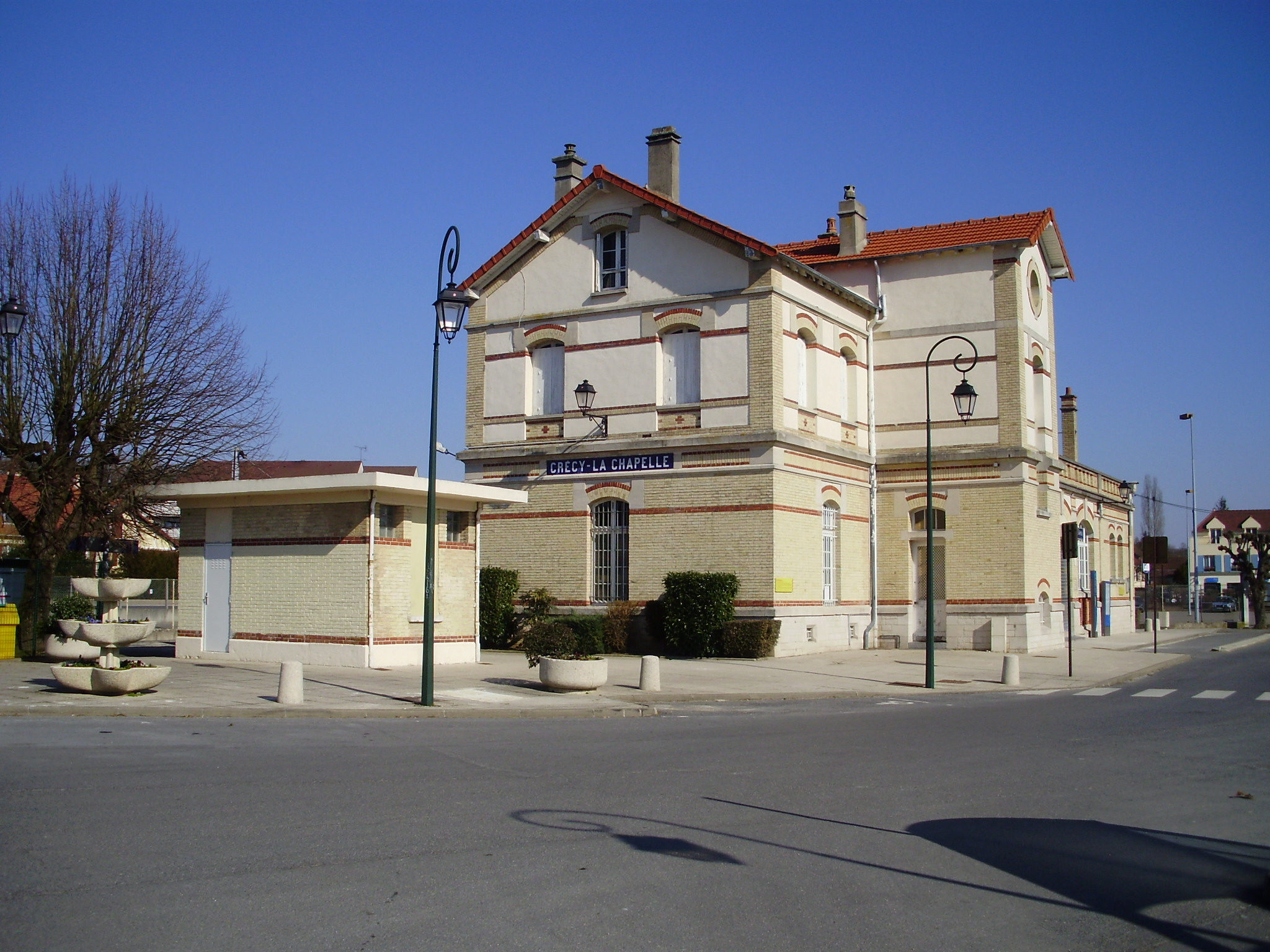
- Crécy-la-Chapelle station in 2010.

General information
- Location: Avenue de la Gare; Crécy-la-Chapelle; France
- Coordinates: 48°51′34″N 2°54′21″E
- Elevation: 51 m (167 ft)
- Operator: SNCF
- Platforms: 1
- Tracks: 1

Construction
- Accessible: No
- Architect: Paul-Adrien Gouny

Other information
- Station code: 87116772
- Fare zone: 5

History
- Opened: 12 July 1902

Passengers
- 2019: 190,995

Services
Preceding station	Tram	Following station
Villiers-Montbarbin towards Esbly	T14	Terminus
Location

Crécy-la-Chapelle station (French: Gare de Crécy-la-Chapelle) is a railway station serving the town Crécy-la-Chapelle, Seine-et-Marne department, northern France. It is the terminus of the line from Esbly to Crécy-la-Chapelle.

== See also ==
- List of SNCF stations in Île-de-France
- List of Transilien stations
