= Peugeot Type 15 =

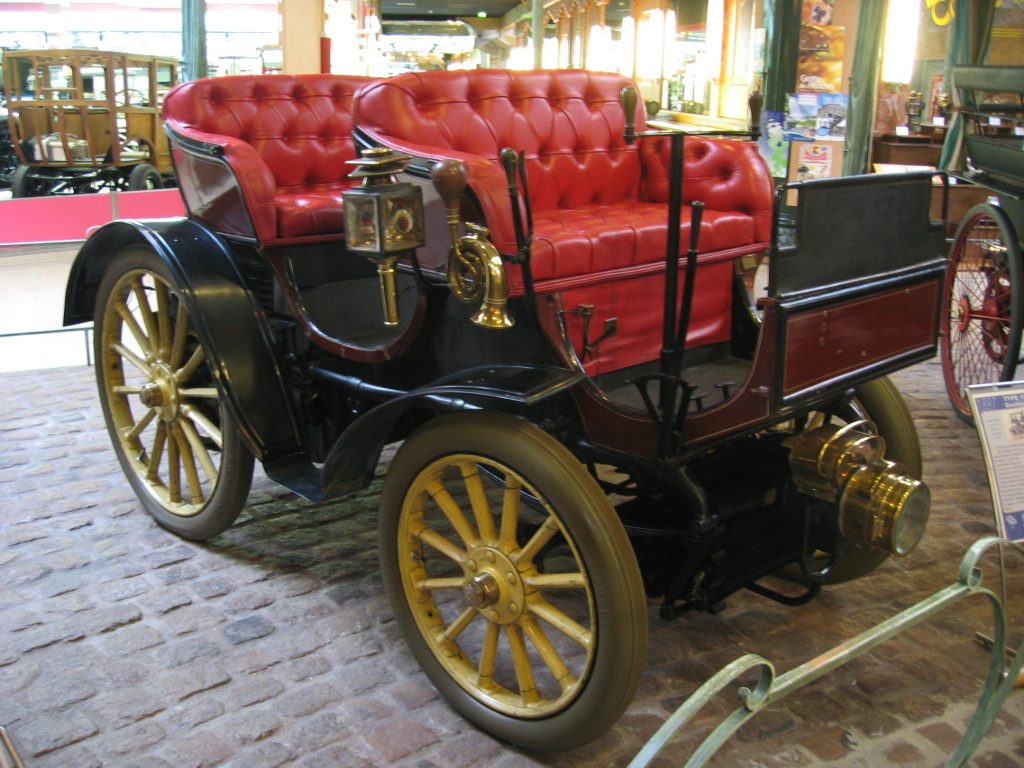

Overview
- Manufacturer: S. A. des Automobiles Peugeot
- Production: 1897–1901 (276 produced)
- Assembly: Audincourt

Body and chassis
- Body style: 4-seater phaeton
- Layout: RR layout

Powertrain
- Engine: Flat-twin

Chronology
- Predecessor: Peugeot Type 14
- Successor: Peugeot Type 16

The Peugeot Type 15 was an early Peugeot model built from 1897 to 1901. Its production run of 276 vehicles was the highest by the company up to that point, and in excess of all previous models combined.

== Engine ==
Peugeot ended its Daimler partnership and produced their first in-house engine for this car, made in their recently built Audincourt factory. Their transversely mounted flat-twin was a departure from this prior foreign-made V-twin engine. It produced 8 bhp.

== Famous owners ==
Charles Rolls, who collaborated with Henry Royce to found the famous Rolls-Royce marque in 1906, owned a Peugeot Type 15 and established a dealership in Britain selling Peugeot and other French cars in 1902. Alberto Santos-Dumont purchased a Type 15 while in France, and later had it exported to his home country of Brazil.

== See also ==
- Timeline of most powerful production cars
