= Tramways in Île-de-France =

Tram system serving the immediate vicinity of Paris, France (the Ile-de-France region)

Île-de-France tramway

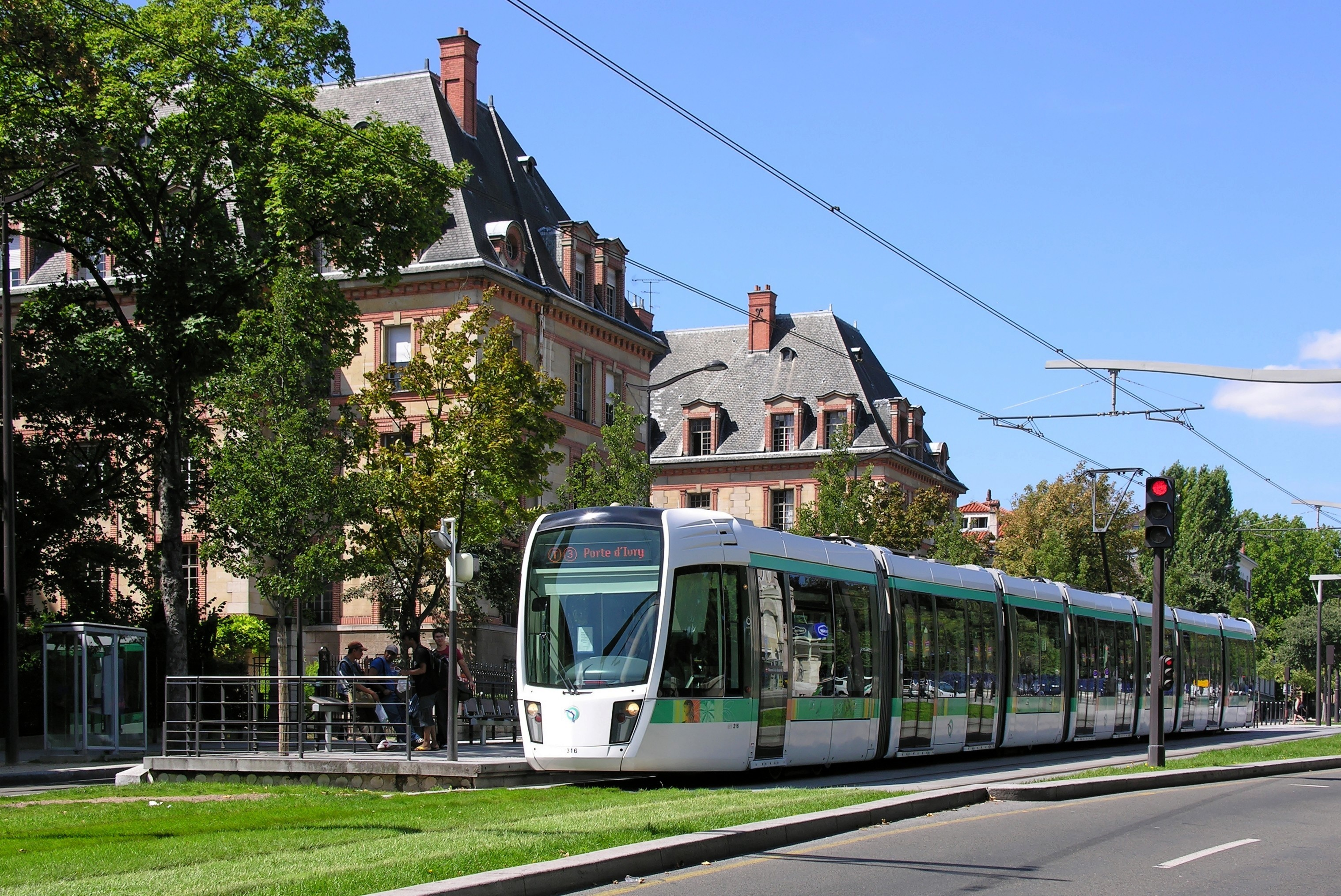
- Tram on Line T3a on green track in front of the Cité Internationale Universitaire de Paris

Overview
- Native name: Tramways d'Île-de-France
- Locale: Île-de-France, France
- Transit type: Light rail/tram
- Number of lines: 15
- Number of stations: 283 (March 2025)
- Daily ridership: 1.07 million per day 2025; 389 million per year 2025

Operation
- Began operation: 1992
- Operator: RATP / SNCF / Transkeo

Technical
- System length: 196.6 km (122.2 mi) (March 2025)
- Track gauge: 1,435 mm (4 ft 8 1/2 in) standard gauge for conventional lines
System map
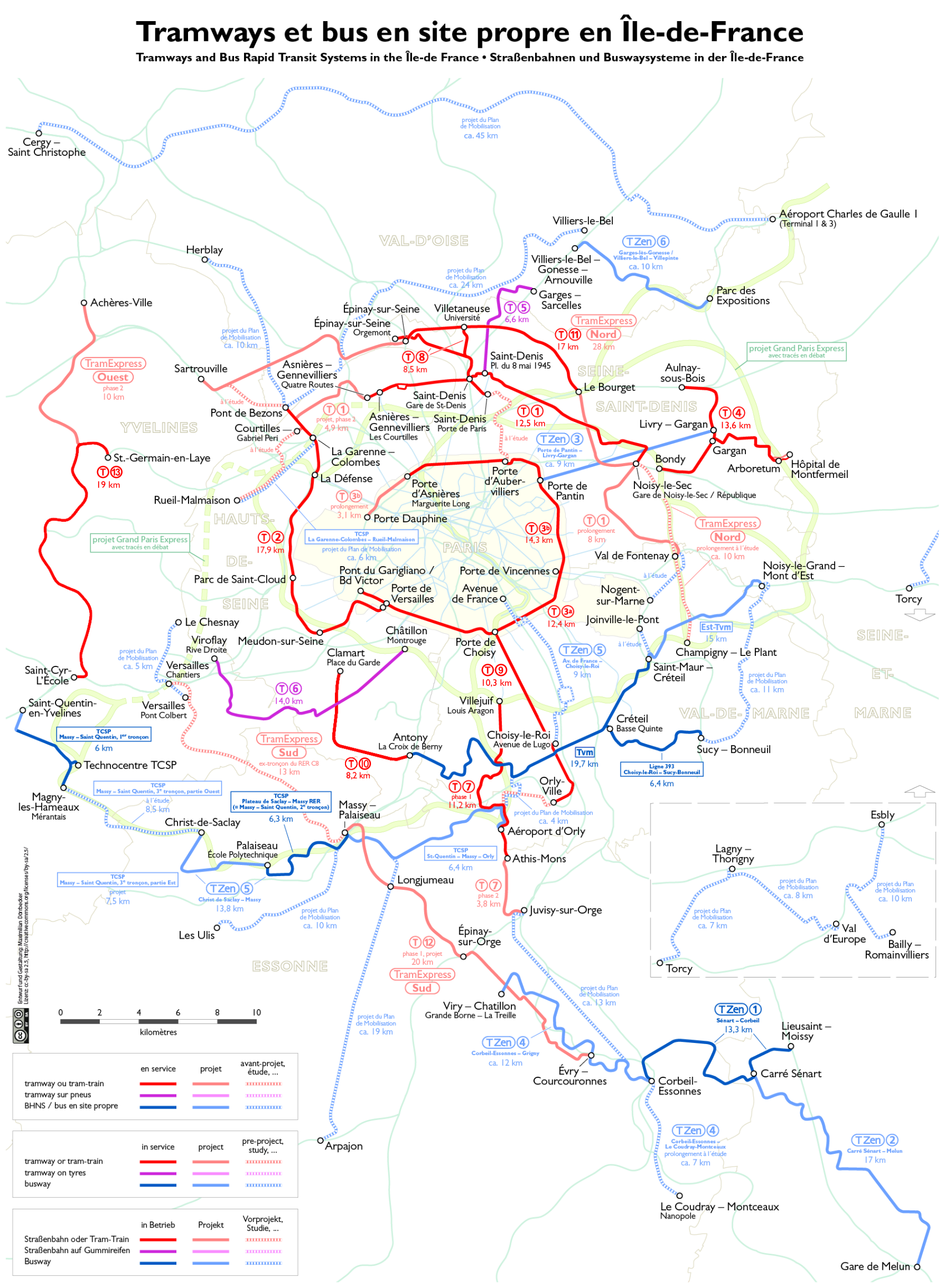

The Île-de-France tramways (French: Tramways d'Île-de-France) is a network of modern tram lines in the Île-de-France region of France. Fifteen lines are currently operational (counting Lines T3a and T3b as separate lines), with extensions and additional lines in both construction and planning stages. Although the system mainly runs in the suburban regions of Paris, lines T3a and T3b run entirely within Paris city limits, serving as a high-capacity ring line replacing the Petite Ceinture bus route, while lines T2 and T9 start their routes within Paris's borders before heading out. While lines operate independently of each other and are generally not connected, some connections do exist: between lines T2 and T3a (at the Porte de Versailles station, since 2009); T3a and T3b (at the Porte de Vincennes station, since 2012); T1 and T5 (at the Marché de Saint-Denis station, since 2013); T1 and T8 (at the Saint-Denis train station, since 2014); T8 and T11 (at both Villetaneuse-Université and Épinay-sur-Seine stations, since 2017); T3a and T9 (at the Porte de Choisy station, since 2021); and T6 and T10 (at Hôpital Béclère, since 2023). However, the final design of the entire planned tram network is fairly integrated. (The prefix "T" in tram line numbers avoids confusion with the numbering of Paris Métro lines, a pattern followed in other public transport networks such as the new cable car route in Créteil, dubbed C1.)

Most lines (with the exceptions of lines T4, T9, T11, T12, T13, and T14) are operated by RATP Group, which also operates the Paris Métro and most bus services in the Paris immediate area. Furthermore, while most lines use conventional steel-wheel rolling stock, two lines (T5 and T6) use rubber-tyred trams. Lines T4, T11, T12, T13 and T14 are tram-trains, sharing tracks with main-line railways, and are operated as part of French national rail operator SNCF's Transilien regional rail network.

== History ==
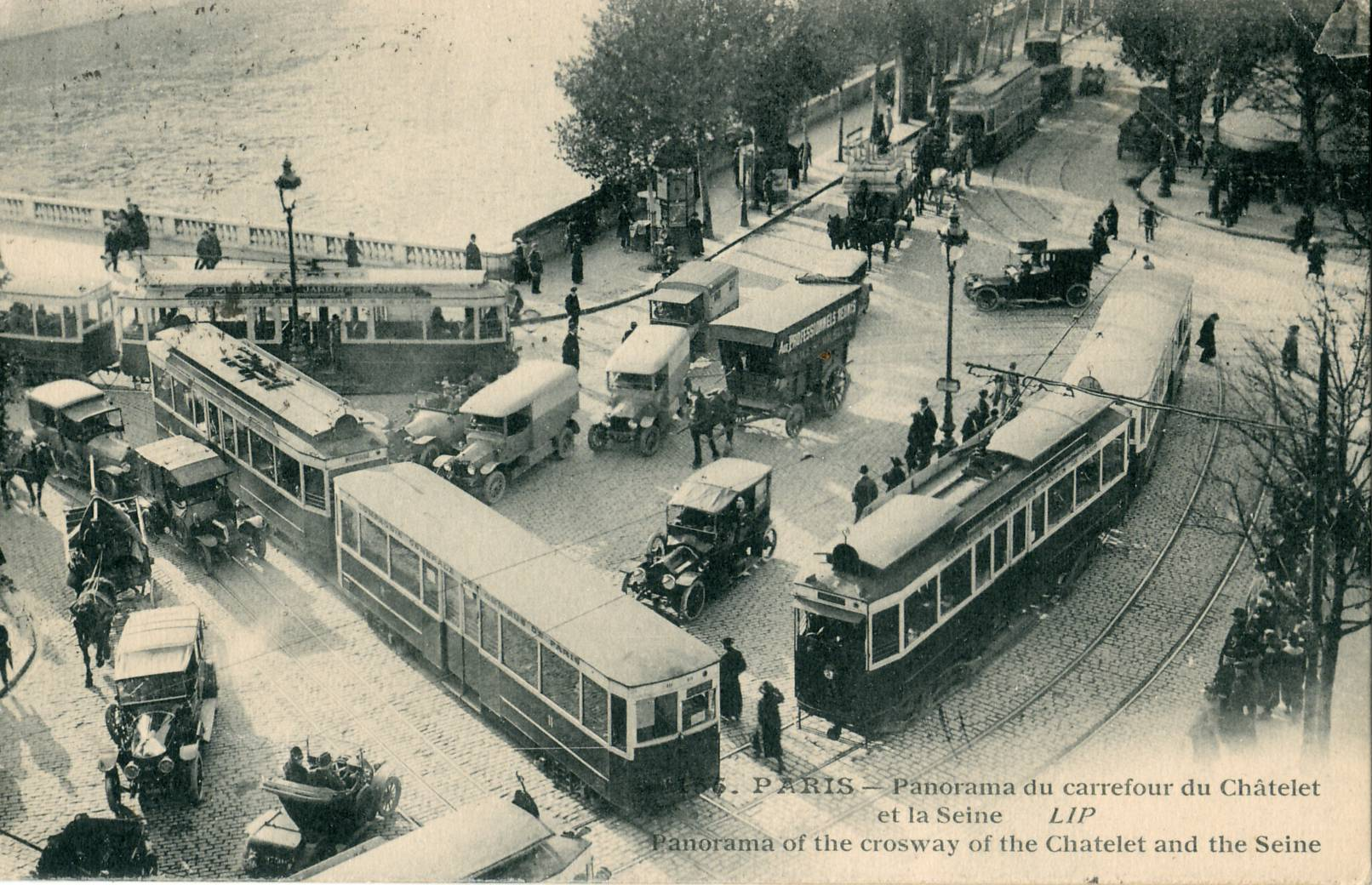
Trams of the former network, seen near the Pont au Change in central Paris

From 1855 to 1938, Paris was served by an extensive tramway network, predating the Paris Métro by nearly a half-century. In 1925 the network had a 1,111 km (690 mi) length, with 122 lines. In the 1930s, the oil and automobile industry lobbies put pressure on the Paris Police Prefecture to remove tram tracks and make room for cars. The last of these first generation tram lines inside of Paris, connecting Porte de Saint-Cloud to Porte de Vincennes, was closed in 1937, and the last line in the entire Paris agglomeration, running between Le Raincy and Montfermeil, ended its service on 14 August 1938.

Originally horse-powered, Paris trams used steam, as well as later pneumatic engines, then electricity. The funicular that operated in Belleville from 1891 to 1924 is sometimes erroneously thought of as a tramway, but was actually a cable car system.

The first of the new generation of trams in Paris, the current Line T1, opened in 1992, followed by Line T2 in 1997, then Lines T3 and T4 in 2006, as a replacement of a former full-scale commuter train line part of Transilien line P. Lines T5 and T7 opened in 2013, while T6 and T8 opened the following year. T11 was inaugurated in 2017, reopening the northern part of the former Grande Ceinture railway loop to passenger service. T9 opened in 2021, replacing the congestioned bus line 183. T13 opened in 2022, while T10 and T12 – the latter being the first to replace an RER branch – opened in 2023. Line T14 opened in March 2025, also as a replacement for a branch of Transilien Line P, although the line had been operated by tram-trains since 2011.

== Lines ==
| Line | Opening | Length | Stations | Operator | Track system | Technology |
|---|---|---|---|---|---|---|
| Île-de-France tramway Line 1 | 1992 | 17.9 km (11.1 mi) | 37 | RATP | Conventional | Tram |
| Île-de-France tramway Line 2 | 1997 | 17.9 km (11.1 mi) | 24 | RATP | Conventional | Tram |
| Île-de-France tramway Line 3a | 2006 | 12.4 km (7.7 mi) | 25 | RATP | Conventional | Tram |
| Île-de-France tramway Line 3b | 2012 | 17.5 km (10.9 mi) | 33 | RATP | Conventional | Tram |
| Île-de-France tramway Line 4 | 2006 | 13.3 km (8.3 mi) | 20 | SNCF | Conventional | Tram-train |
| Île-de-France tramway Line 5 | 2013 | 6.6 km (4.1 mi) | 16 | RATP | Translohr | Tram |
| Île-de-France tramway Line 6 | 2014 | 14 km (8.7 mi) | 21 | RATP | Translohr | Tram |
| Île-de-France tramway Line 7 | 2013 | 11.2 km (7.0 mi) | 18 | RATP | Conventional | Tram |
| Île-de-France tramway Line 8 | 2014 | 8.5 km (5.3 mi) | 17 | RATP | Conventional | Tram |
| Île-de-France tramway Line 9 | 2021 | 10.3 km (6.4 mi) | 19 | Keolis | Conventional | Tram |
| Île-de-France tramway Line 10 | 2023 | 6.8 km (4.2 mi) | 13 | RATP | Conventional | Tram |
| Île-de-France tramway Line 11 | 2017 | 11 km (6.8 mi) | 7 | Transkeo | Conventional | Tram-train |
| Île-de-France tramway Line 12 | 2023 | 20.4 km (12.7 mi) | 16 | Transkeo | Conventional | Tram-train |
| Île-de-France tramway Line 13 | 2022 | 18.8 km (11.7 mi) | 12 | Transkeo | Conventional | Tram-train |
| Île-de-France tramway Line 14 | 2025 | 9.945 km (6.180 mi) | 5 | Stretto | Conventional | Tram-train |
| Total | | 196.55 km (122.13 mi) | 283 | | | |

=== T1 ===
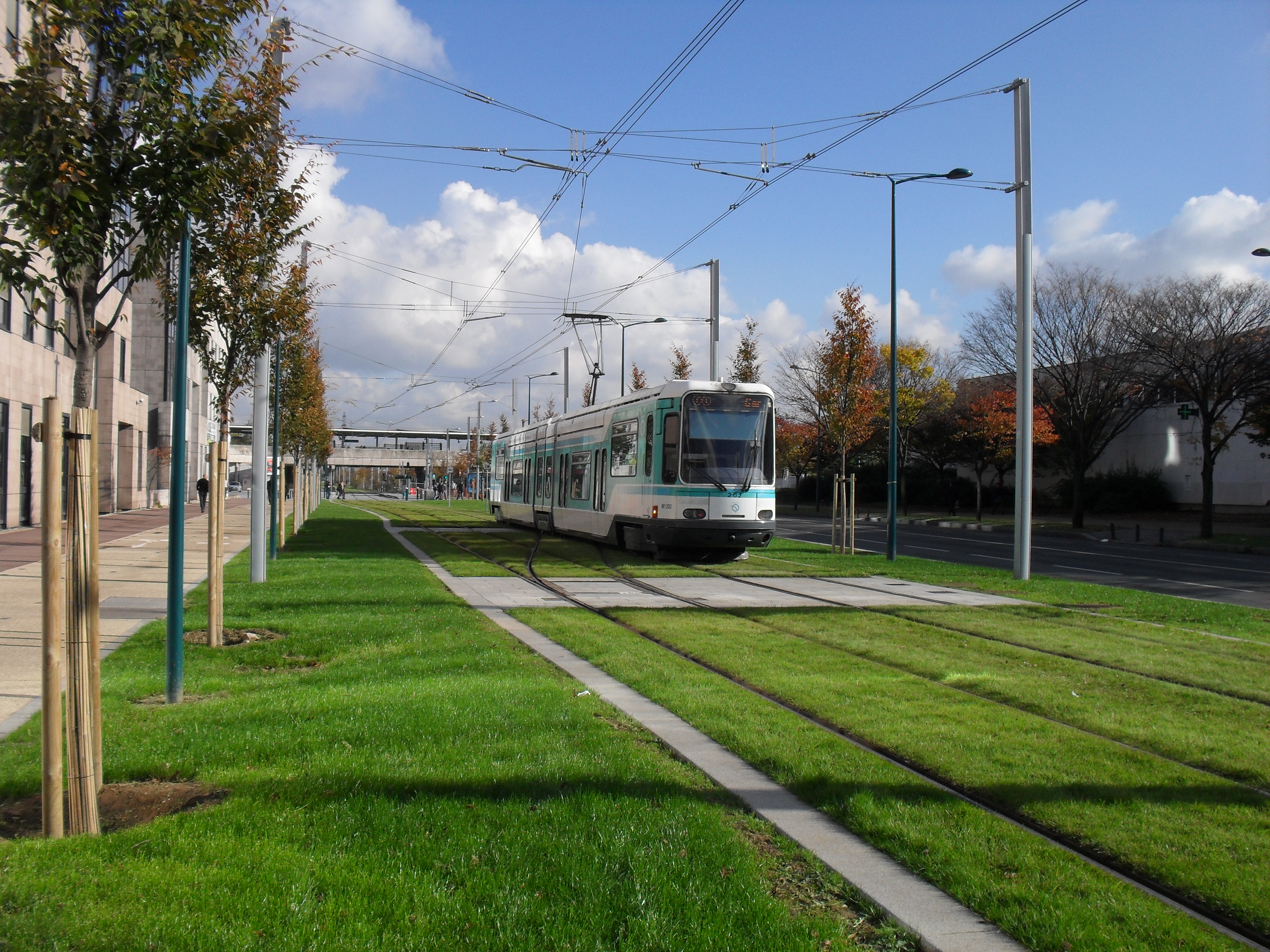
Line T1

Line T1 currently connects Asnières-sur-Seine and Gennevilliers to Noisy-le-Sec, running almost parallel to the Paris city's northern limit. It opened in 1992 from Saint Denis' RER station to the Bobigny–Pablo Picasso Paris Métro station, where the prefecture offices of the Seine-Saint-Denis department are located. The eastern extension from Bobigny to Noisy-le-Sec was completed in 2003, while the western extension to Asnières-sur-Seine and Gennevilliers, connecting to northwestern branch of Paris Métro Line 13, opened in 2012. A continuation towards Nanterre is planned on the western side, while another one towards Montreuil, then to the Val de Fontenay RER station is also planned on the eastern side of the line.

=== T2 ===
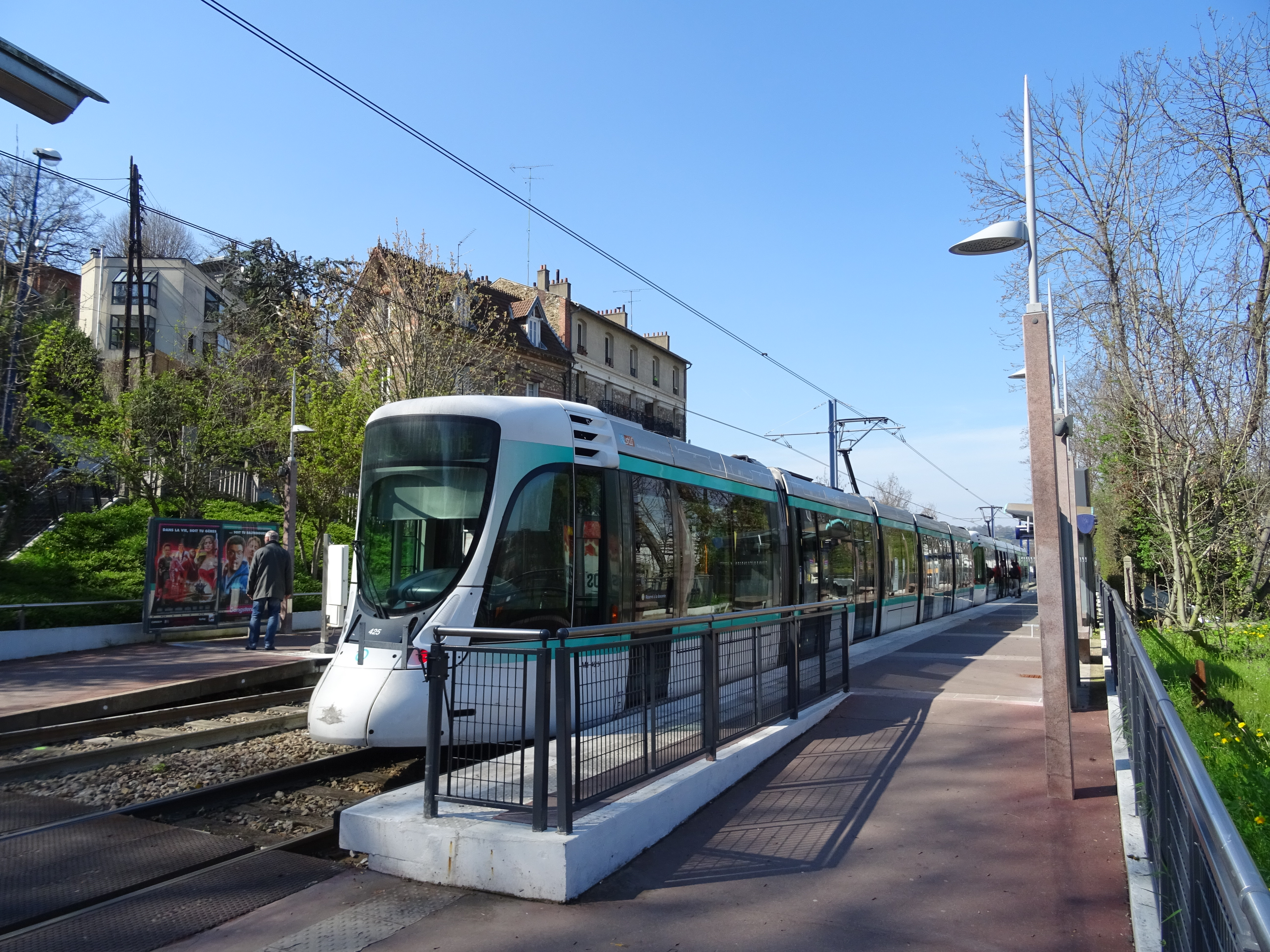
Line T2

Line T2 (Trans Val-de-Seine) connects the bridge of Bezons (Pont de Bezons) to the Porte de Versailles Paris Métro station (near Paris's main exhibit grounds) via La Défense and Issy-les-Moulineaux business districts. It opened in 1997 between La Défense and Issy–Val de Seine stations, exploiting a former SNCF line, the Moulineaux Line, which closed to regular train traffic in 1993. Tram line T2 was first extended south in 2009, from Issy–Val de Seine station to the Porte de Versailles, then north in 2012 from La Défense to the Pont de Bezons.

=== T3a and T3b ===
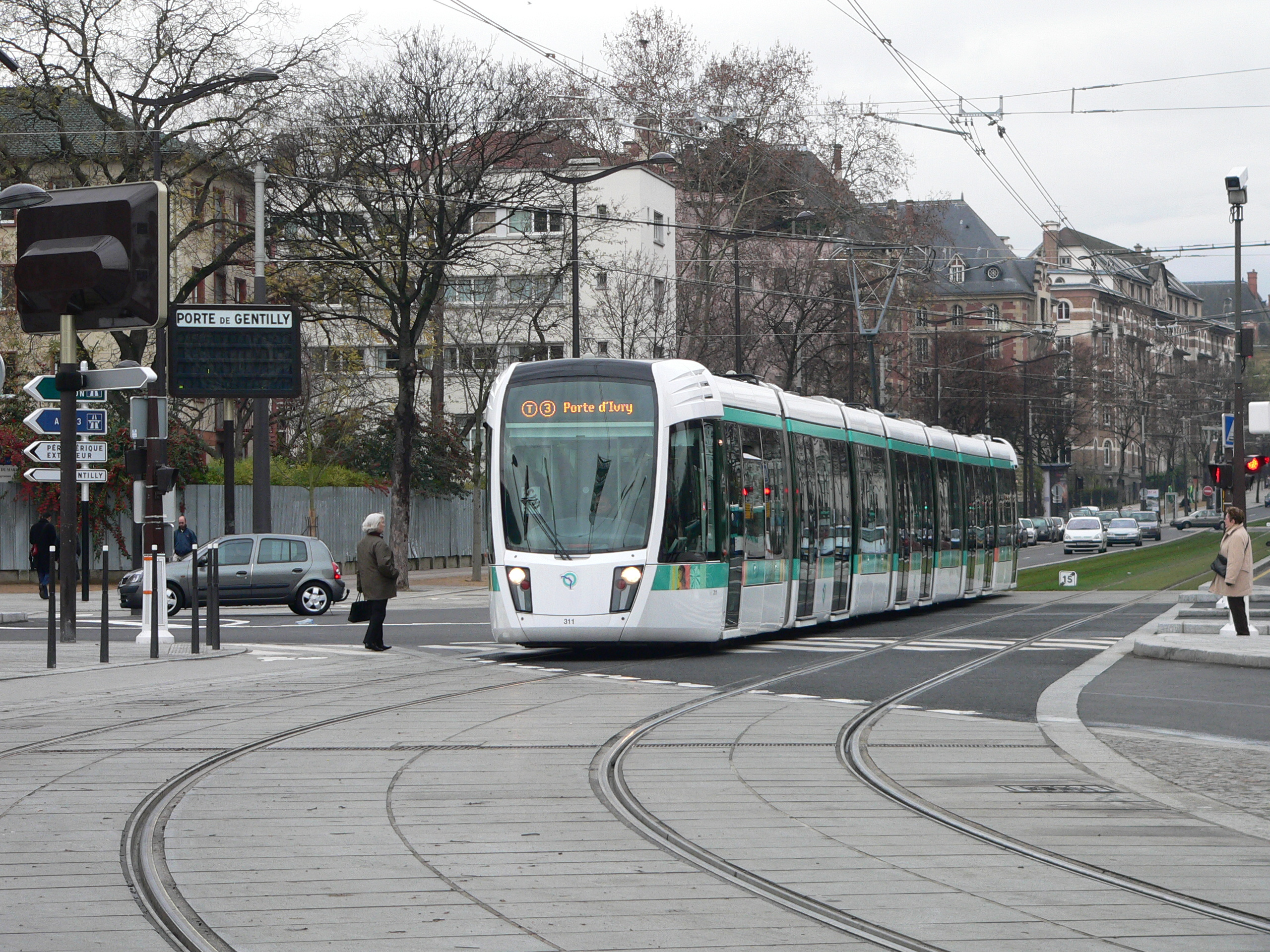
Line T3a

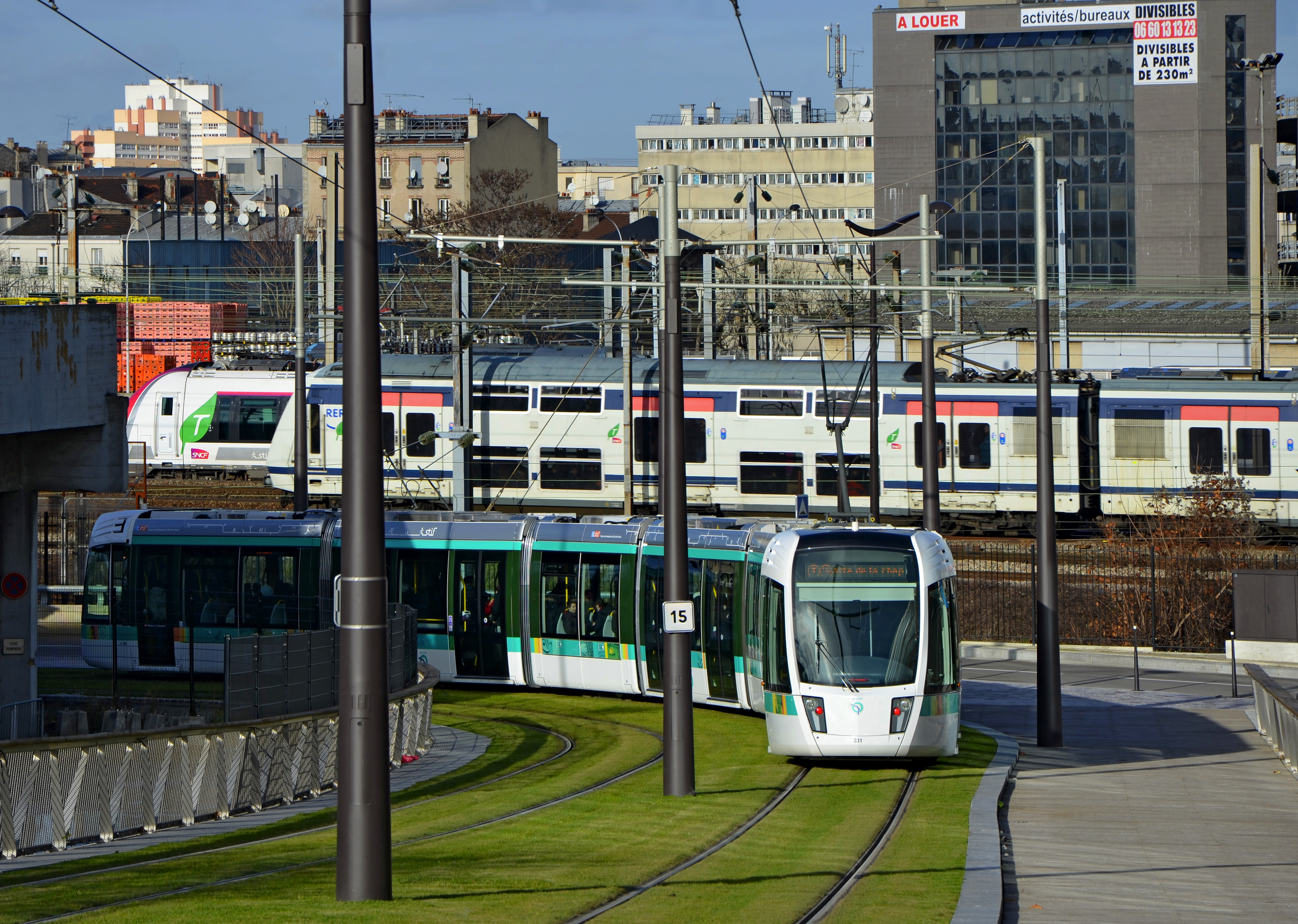
Line T3b

Line T3 (Tramway des Maréchaux) was the first modern tramway line to actually enter Paris city itself, before T2 and T9. It is divided into two sections, called T3a and T3b, separated at the Porte de Vincennes in order not to cut the road traffic there, despite rail and electrical infrastructure being present and operational. The line bears its name as it follows the Boulevards of the Marshals, a series of boulevards that encircle Paris along the route of the former Thiers Wall, built from 1841 to 1844. The boulevards are, with three exceptions, all named from Napoleon's First Empire marshals (maréchaux).

T3a connects the Pont du Garigliano–Hôpital européen Georges-Pompidou RER station in the southwestern part of the 15th arrondissement, with the Porte de Vincennes in the northeastern corner of the 12th arrondissement. T3b connects Porte de Vincennes with to the Porte Dauphine (16th arrondissement) alongside the eastern and northern borders of the French capital.

=== T4 ===
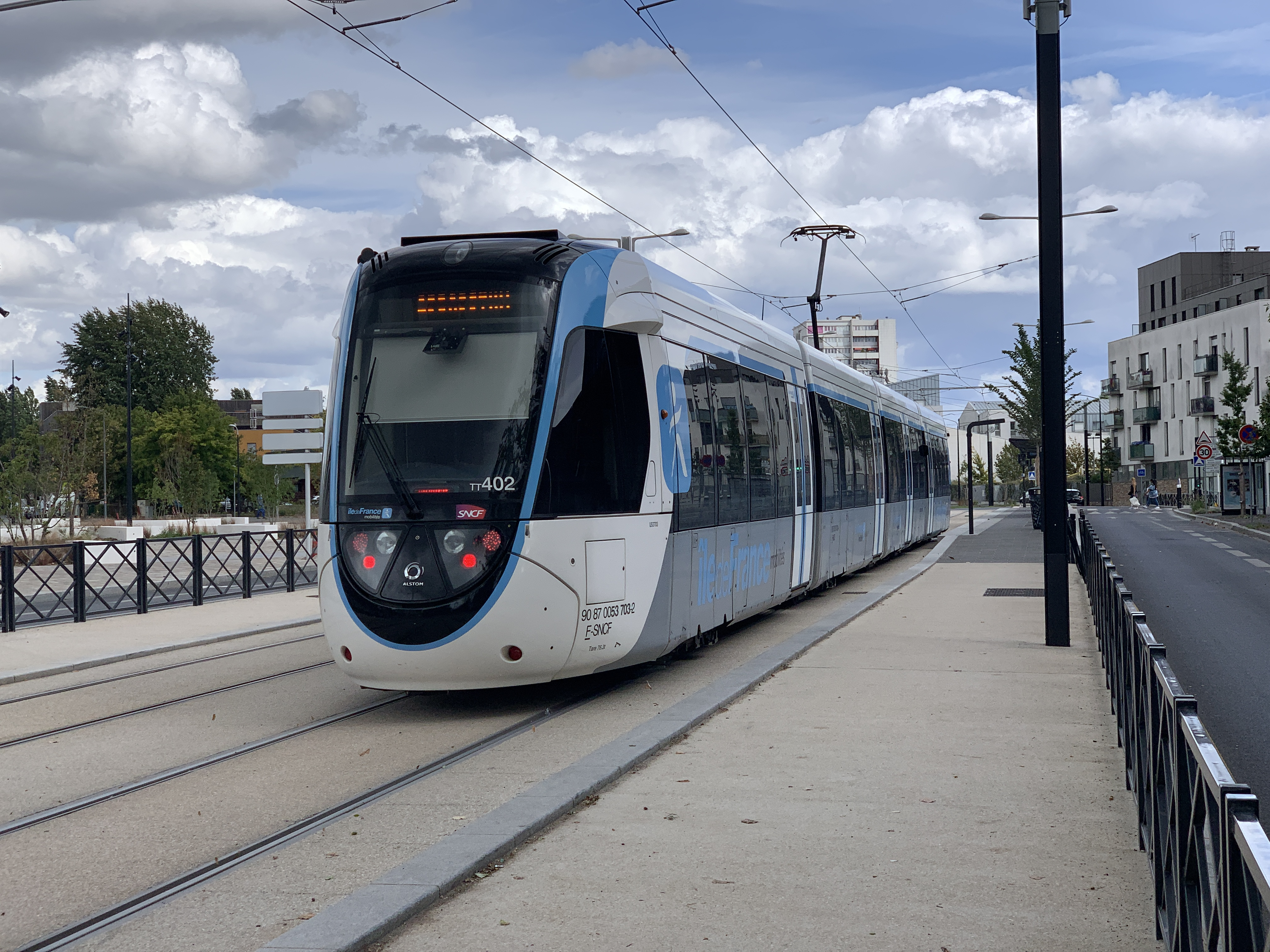
Line T4

Line T4 is an 8-kilometre (5.0 mi), 11-stop forked tram-train line, connecting the Bondy and Aulnay-sous-Bois RER stations reusing a former train line then part of Transilien Line P, on a process similar to Line 2. It opened on 18 November 2006. Unlike the other tramways in Île-de-France, Line T4 is operated by the SNCF. A new branch of this tram-train line, heading east towards Montfermeil, opened in 2020.

=== T5 ===
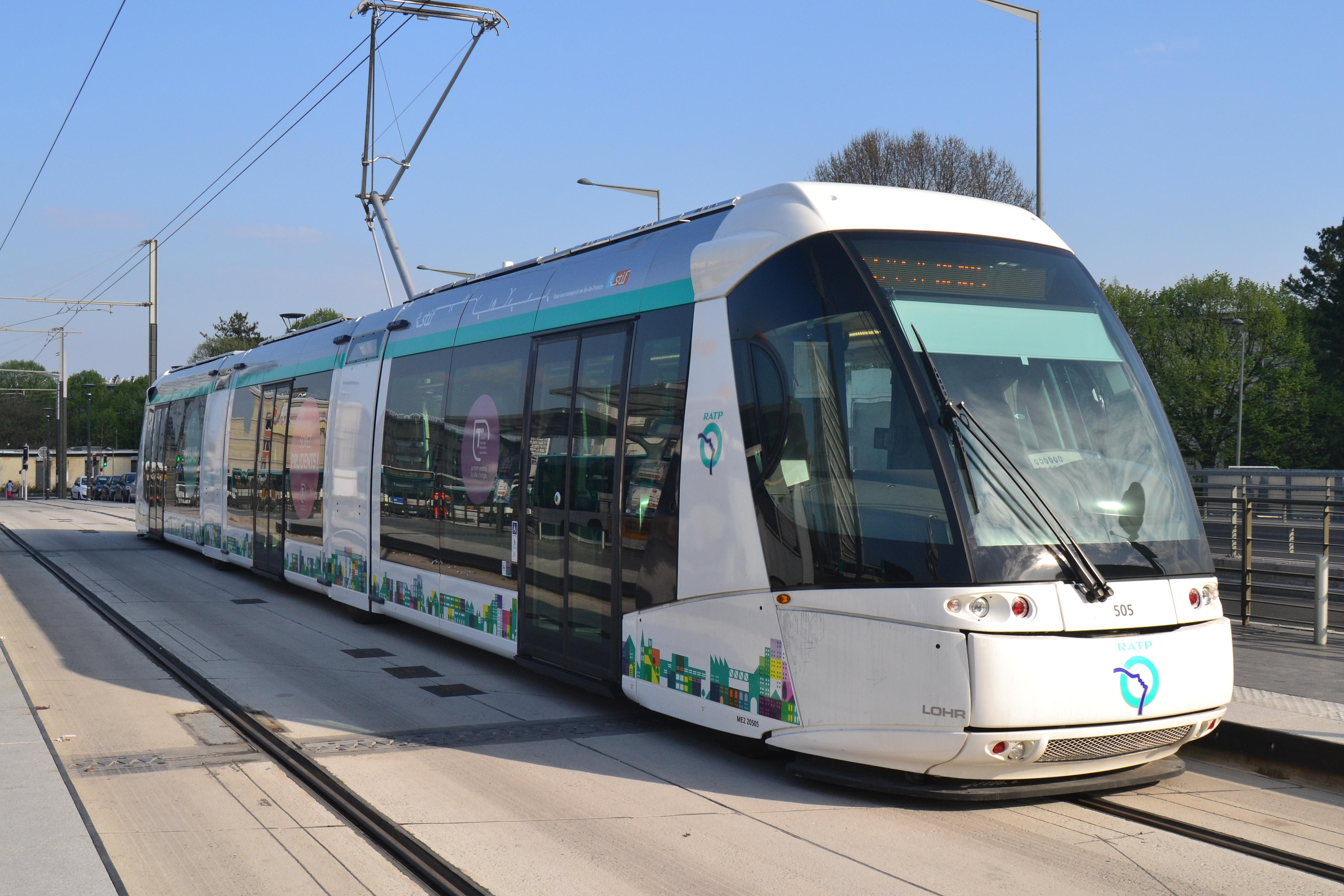
Line T5

Tramway T5 is a Translohr tram-on-tyres running along a mainly segregated "track" on the busy Route Nationale 1 (similar to the systems in Nancy or Caen) where it replaces the former bus lines 168 and 268. The 6.6-kilometre (4.1 mi) route serves 16 stops between Saint-Denis, Pierrefitte-sur-Seine, Sarcelles and Garges-lès-Gonesse. It has an interchange with T1 at its southernmost terminus, Marché de Saint-Denis, and with RER D at its northernmost terminus, the Garges-Sarcelles RER station. Line T5 opened in July 2013.

=== T6 ===
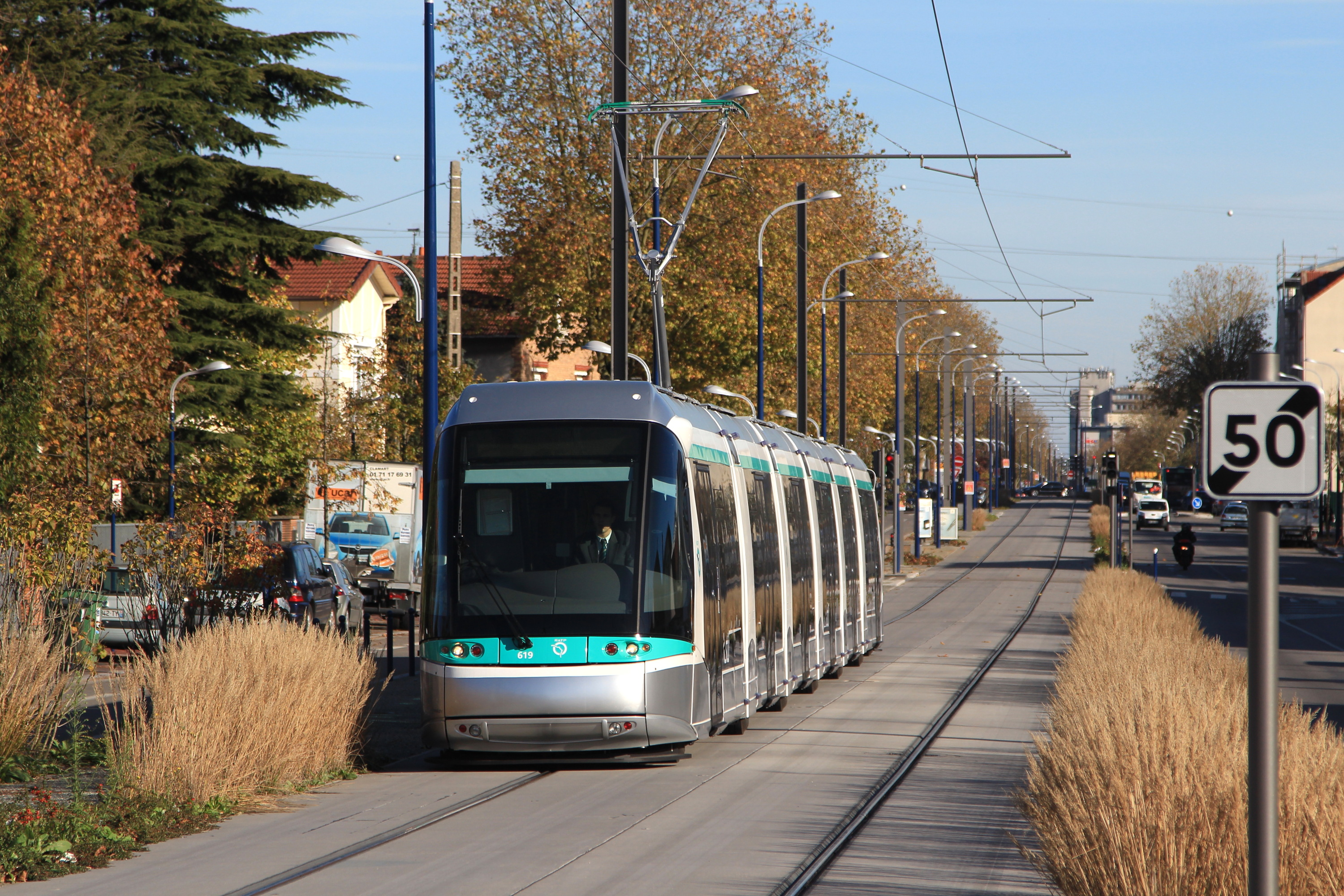
Line T6

Tramway Line 6 is a 14-kilometre (8.7 mi) Translohr tram-on-tyres line serving 21 stations, from the Viroflay-Rive-Droite Transilien station to the Châtillon–Montrouge Métro station (the southern terminus of Paris Métro Line 13), through Vélizy-Villacoublay. The 1.6 kilometres (0.99 mi) westernmost part of the line (through Viroflay), is entirely underground, comprising a single tunnel crossing the town south to north and including the two final stops, each under the two train stations the city has, Rive-Gauche (Lines C and N) and Rive-Droite (Line L). The majority of the current line opened in 2014, with said tunnel section opening in 2016. It replaced bus line 295, that became overcrowded and too slow for proper use, as well as several former Kéolis lines operating across Vélizy.

=== T7 ===
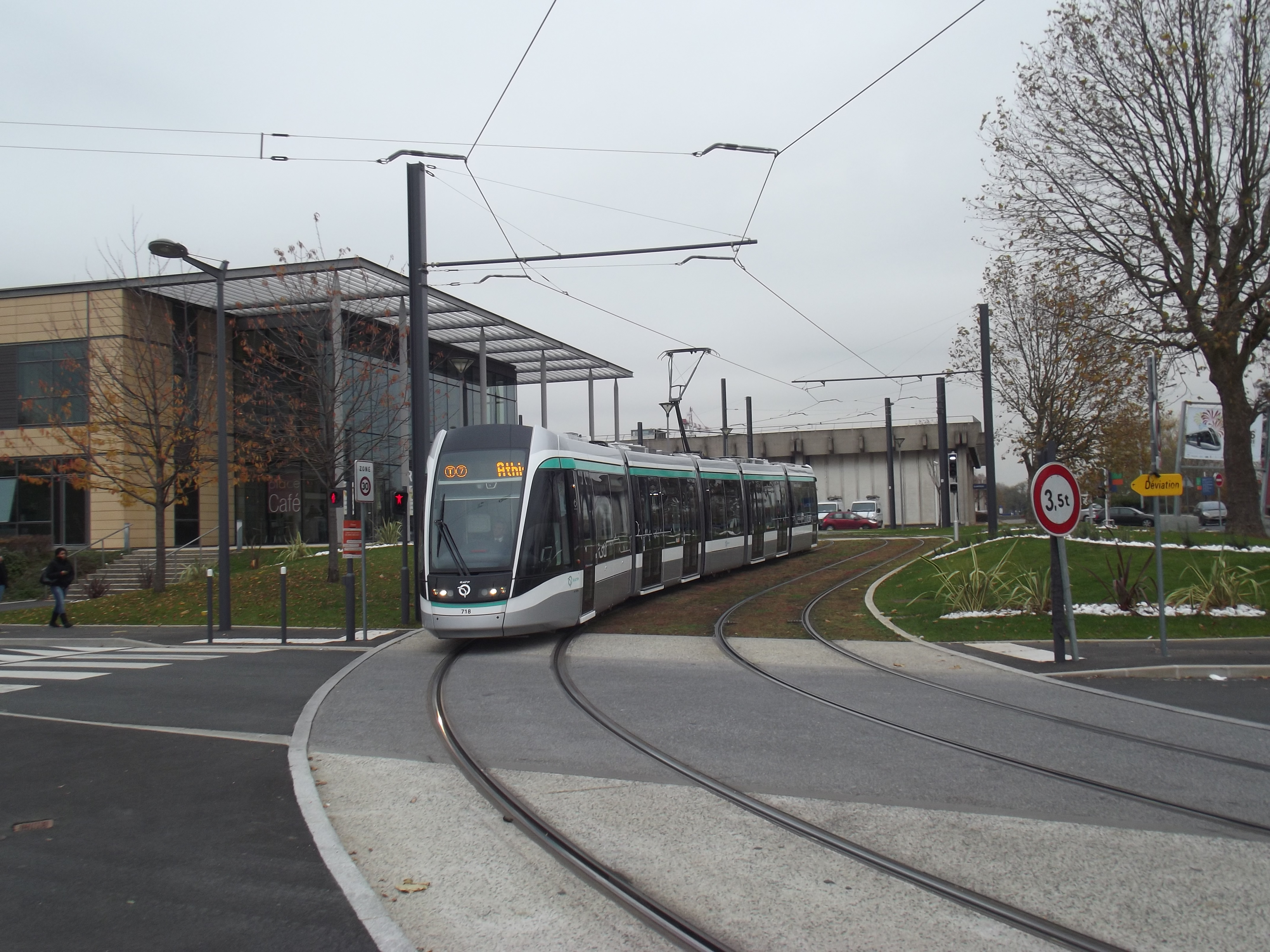
Line T7

Tramway Line 7 is an 11.2-kilometre (7.0 mi) route serving 18 stations between Villejuif–Louis Aragon (southwestern terminus of Paris Métro Line 7) and Athis-Mons, via Rungis International Market and Orly Airport. It opened in 2013 in order to both allow a supplemental rail service from Paris to Orly Airport and replace bus line 285, which had also become overcrowded on its now supplemented part. The remaining part of said bus line is also planned to be replaced by the upcoming southern extension of Tram Line 7 towards the Juvisy-sur-Orge train station.

=== T8 ===
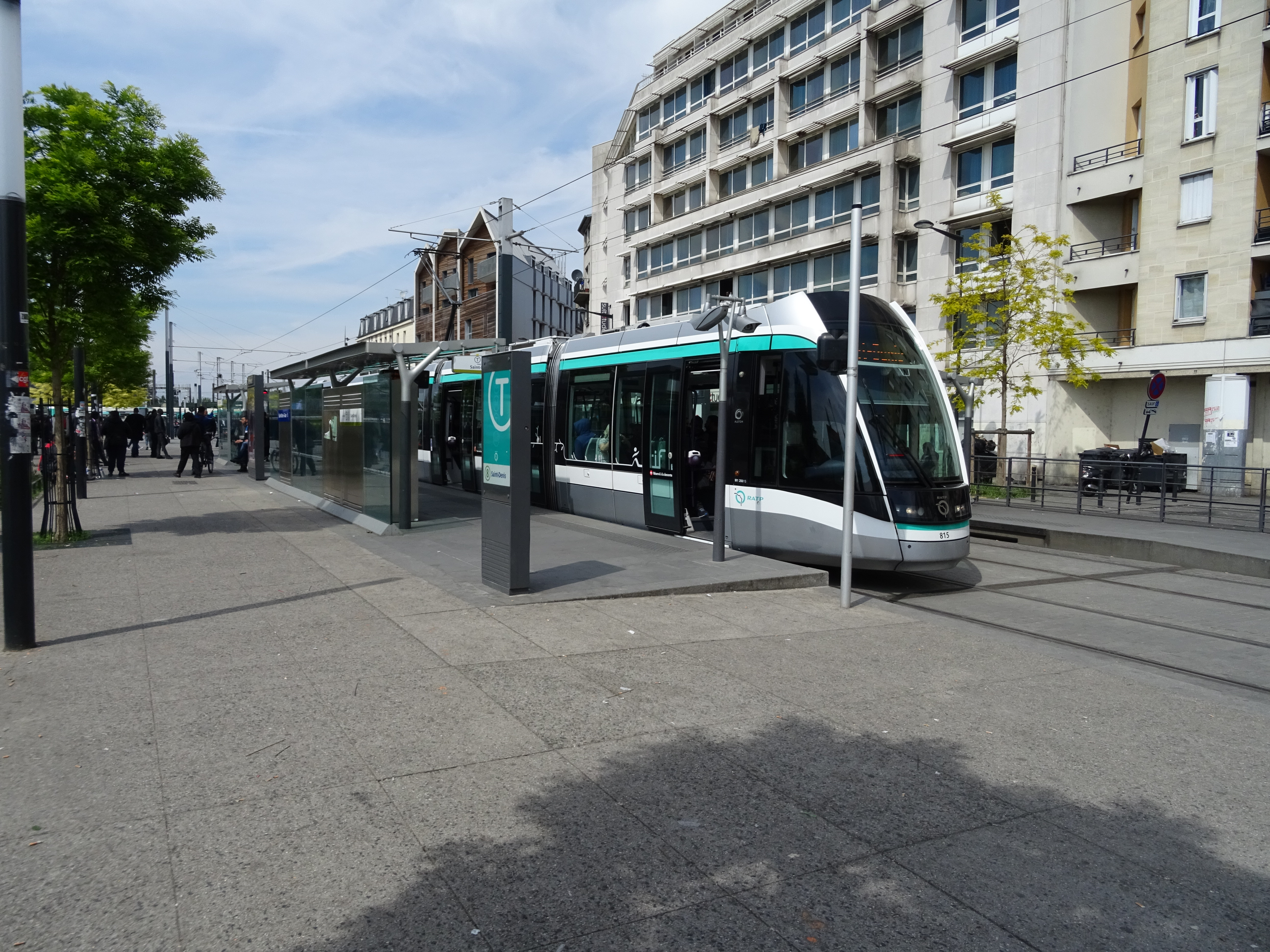
Line T8

Formerly known as Tram'y due to its opening-day Y-shape (while T4 got its Y-shape after its initial opening), this 8.46-kilometre (5.26 mi) tram line goes from the Saint-Denis–Porte de Paris Métro station to Épinay-sur-Seine — Orgemont, with a branch to the university campus of Villetaneuse, where it connects to the more recent T11 Line. An extension is also planned south, to Paris itself, at the Rosa Parks RER station. Construction of the line began in 2010; service began in 2014. The southern extension's opening date has not yet been set.

=== T9 ===
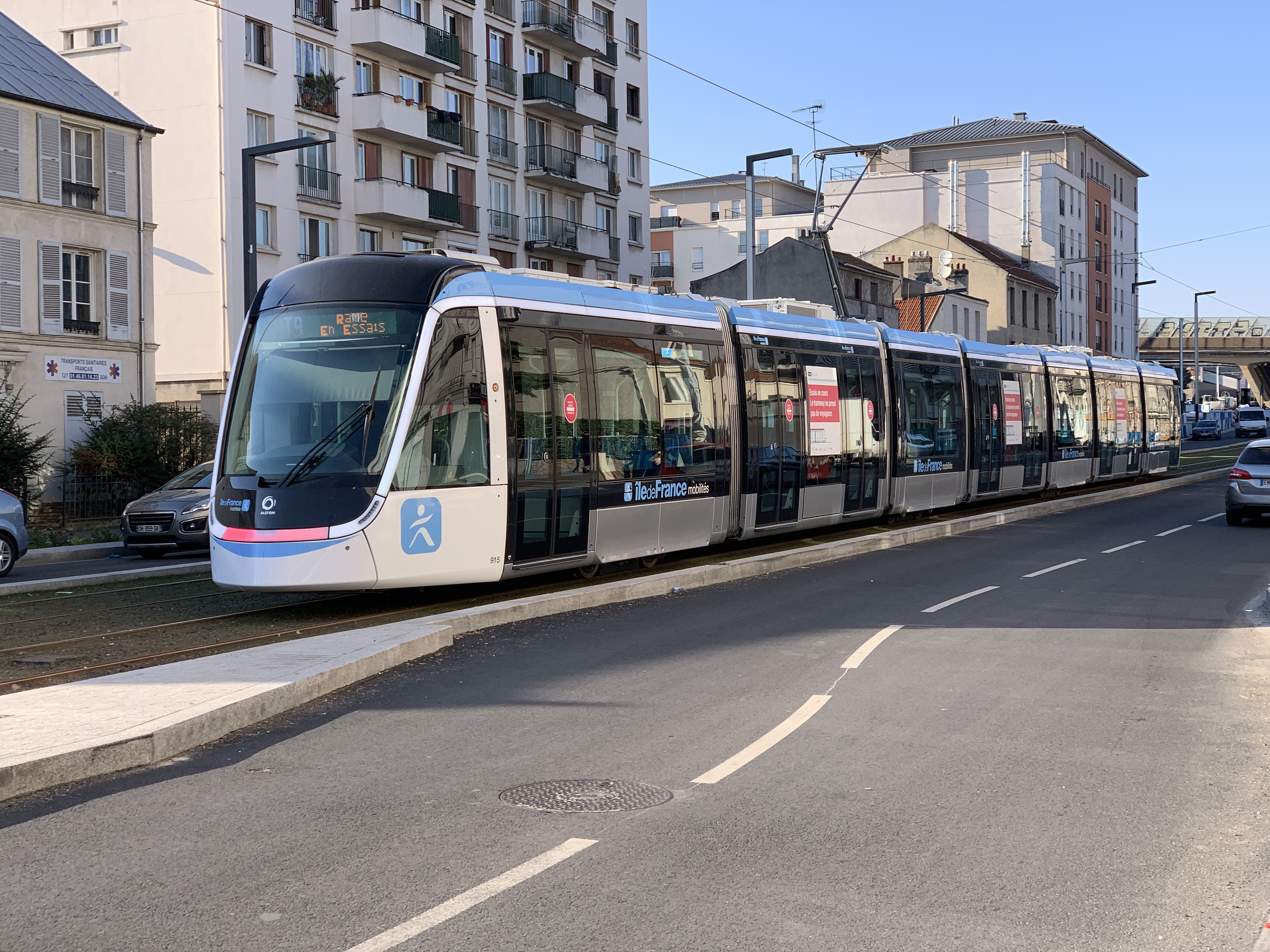
Line T9

T9 is a tram line that runs between the Porte de Choisy Paris Métro station and the centre of Orly with a length of 10.3 km (6.4 mi) and 19 stops. It serves as a replacement to the overcrowded bus line 183.

=== T10 ===
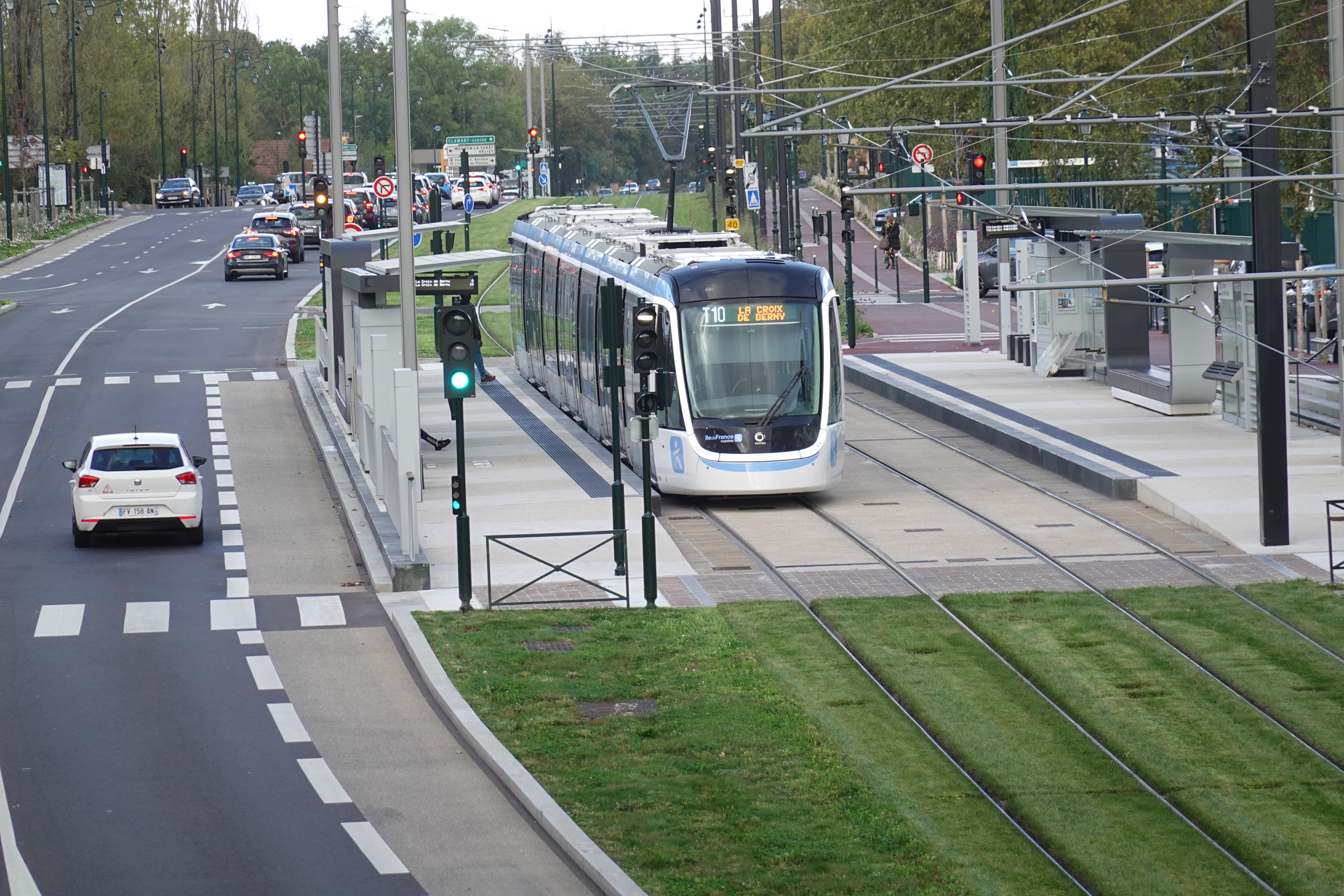
Line T10

T10 is a tram line from Clamart to La Croix de Berny RER station in Antony in the southwestern suburbs of Paris. It opened in 2023 with a length of 6.8 km (4.2 mi) and thirteen stops. An extension north, from the Jardin Parisien towards Clamart's train station (where it will connect to the Grand Paris Express on Métro line 15) is currently under study.

=== T11 ===
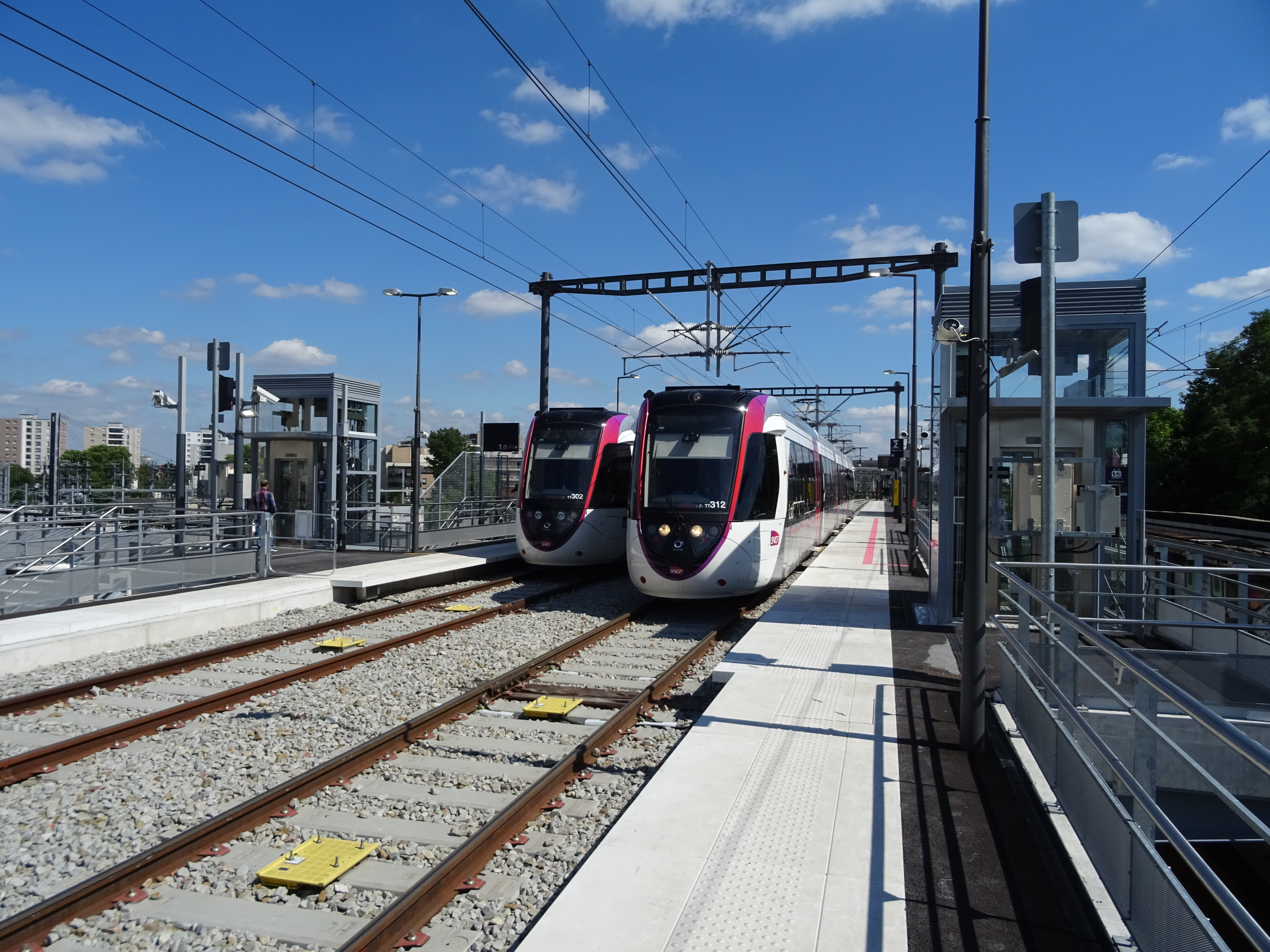
Line T11

T11 is the first "Express" tram line of the Parisian network — due to reusing the long-closed Grande Ceinture train line with only a handful of stations — Line T11 serves as the first of three lines to cover the former Grande Ceinture rail line and offers eventually a second circular railroad service around Paris, something the Paris public transport system sorely lacked for decades.

T11 opened in 2017 between the Épinay-sur-Seine and Le Bourget RER stations, the middle part of its planned full route between Sartrouville and Noisy-le-Sec RER stations. If the planned route was realised, the T11 would become the first tram line to connect all five RER lines currently in service.

=== T12 ===
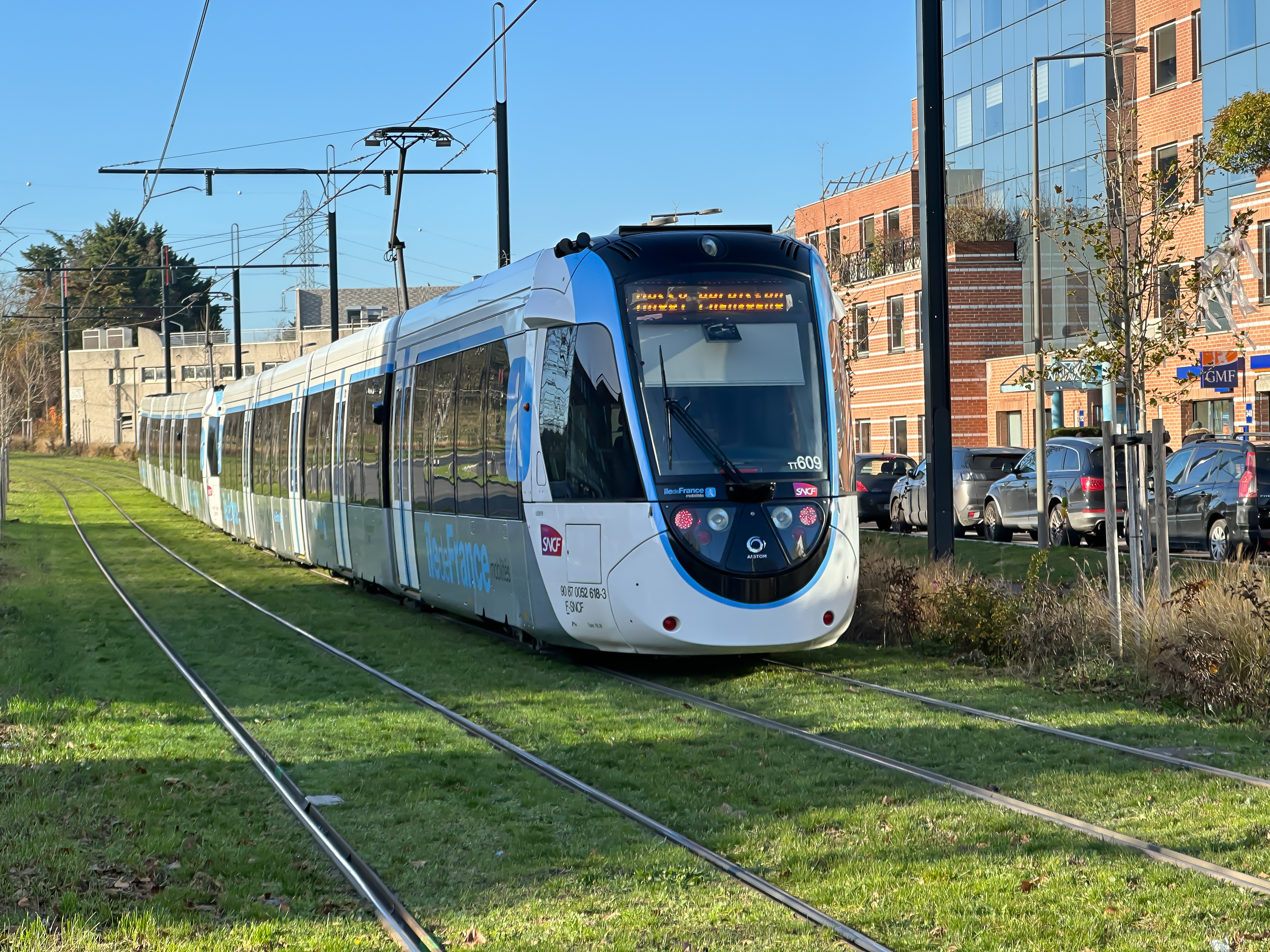
Line T12

T12 is a tram-train line between Évry-Courcouronnes (RER D) and Massy-Palaiseau (RER B and C) train stations via Épinay-sur-Orge station (RER C), with a length of 20 km (12 mi) and 16 stops. This line uses the stretch of railway between Épinay and Massy formerly served by RER C. An extension of T12 further northwest, towards Versailles-Chantiers, is planned and would take over Transilien line V between Massy and Versailles as well if entered, effectively connecting the prefectures of both Yvelines and Essonne départements.

=== T13 ===
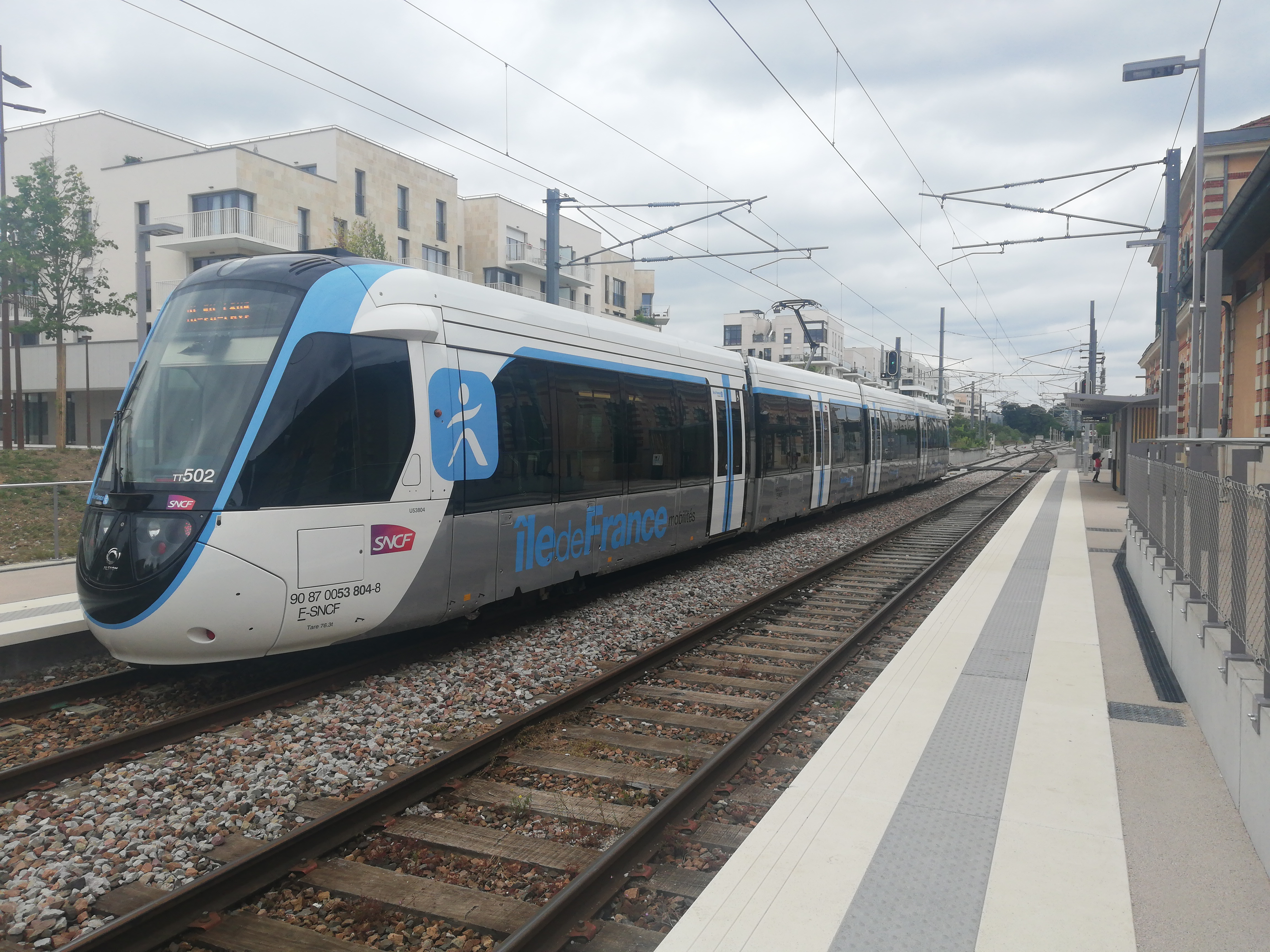
Line T13

T13 is a tram-train line between Saint-Germain-en-Laye and Saint-Cyr-l'École train stations (RER C and Transilien lines N and U) via the westernmost point of the gardens of Versailles with a length of 18.8 km (11.7 mi) and 11 stops. It opened on 6 July 2022.

An extension to Achères-Ville RER station is at the planning stage, with Île-de-France Mobilités setting 2028 as the target opening date.

=== T14 ===
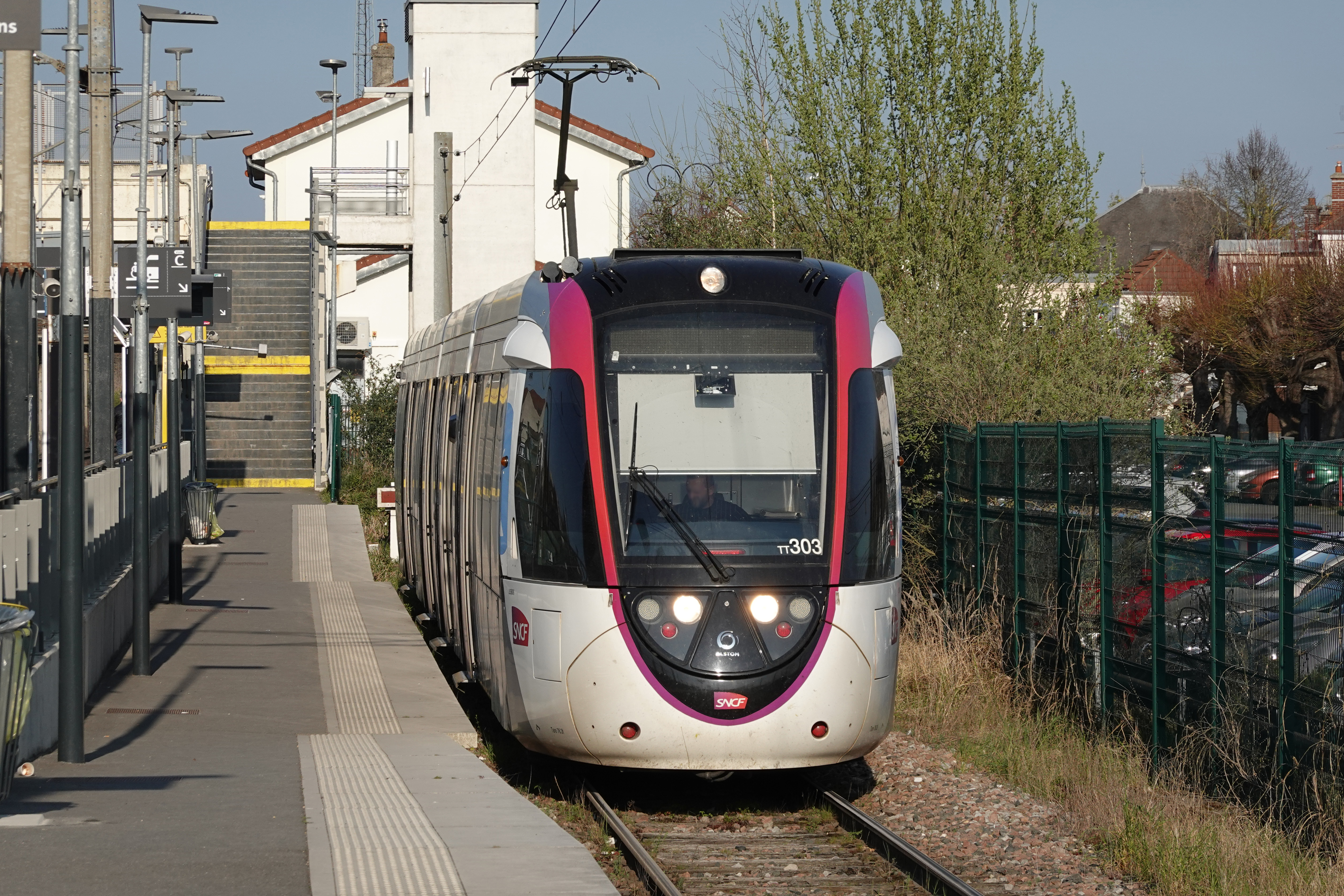
Line T14

T14 is a 9.9 km (6.2 mi) tram-train route that took over the Crécy-la-Chapelle–Esbly line from Transilien Line P on 22 March 2025. T14 is operated by Stretto, a consortium of Keolis and SNCF.

The branch line, which consists of 5 stops from Esbly to Crécy-la-Chapelle, has been a tram-train line since 4 July 2011, when the low-floor U 25500 entered service. The line is currently operated by the U 53600, which replaced the former on 8 March 2022 due to reliability issues.

== TVM ==
The Trans-Val-de-Marne bus line, which runs in a designated BRT corridor (bus rapid transit) and is intended to provide high-capacity, rapid bus transit southeast of Paris in the department of Val-de-Marne, is operated by RATP unlike most suburban bus lines. Despite beginning with a T, it is not a tramway. The RATP however considers it to be part of the T network, and is currently drawing plans for more BRT lines. The Tvm has been certified to be BRT with Silver Excellence in 2014.

== See also ==
- List of tram stops in Île-de-France
- Transportation in Paris
- Trams in France
- List of town tramway systems in France
- List of tram and light rail transit systems
