= Peugeot Type 14 =

Overview
- Manufacturer: Peugeot
- Production: 1896 – 1898; 18 made

Body and chassis
- Class: mid-sized car
- Layout: RR layout

Dimensions
- Wheelbase: 1,450 mm (57.1 in)
- Length: 2,300 mm (90.6 in)

Chronology
- Successor: Peugeot Type 15

The Peugeot Type 14 is an early motor car produced between 1896 and 1898 by the French auto-maker Peugeot at their Audincourt plant. First presented in public at the end of 1896 the Type 14 was the first new car introduction after Armand Peugeot’s new company “Automobiles Peugeot” had been registered, following formalisation of Armand's split from the then principal Peugeot business.

The car was also the first Peugeot to be powered by an engine developed by Peugeot themselves. Peugeots had previously been power by Daimler designed engines. Peugeot's newly developed parallel-twin-cylinder four stroke 1,645 cc engine was mounted beneath and behind the driver. A maximum 4 hp of power was delivered to the rear wheels by means of a chain-drive mechanism.

The 2300 mm long two seater open carriage format body sat on a 1450 mm wheelbase.

The model's successor, the more commodious, larger engined and faster Peugeot Type 15 was already in production by 1897, and the Type 14 turned out to be something of a stop-gap model. Only 18 Peugeot Type 14s were produced.

== Sources and further reading ==
- Wolfgang Schmarbeck: Alle Peugeot Automobile 1890-1990. Motorbuch-Verlag. Stuttgart 1990. ISBN 3-613-01351-7
