= GNR Class J14 =

0-6-0ST Steam Locomotive Class

GNR Class J14 LNER Class J53
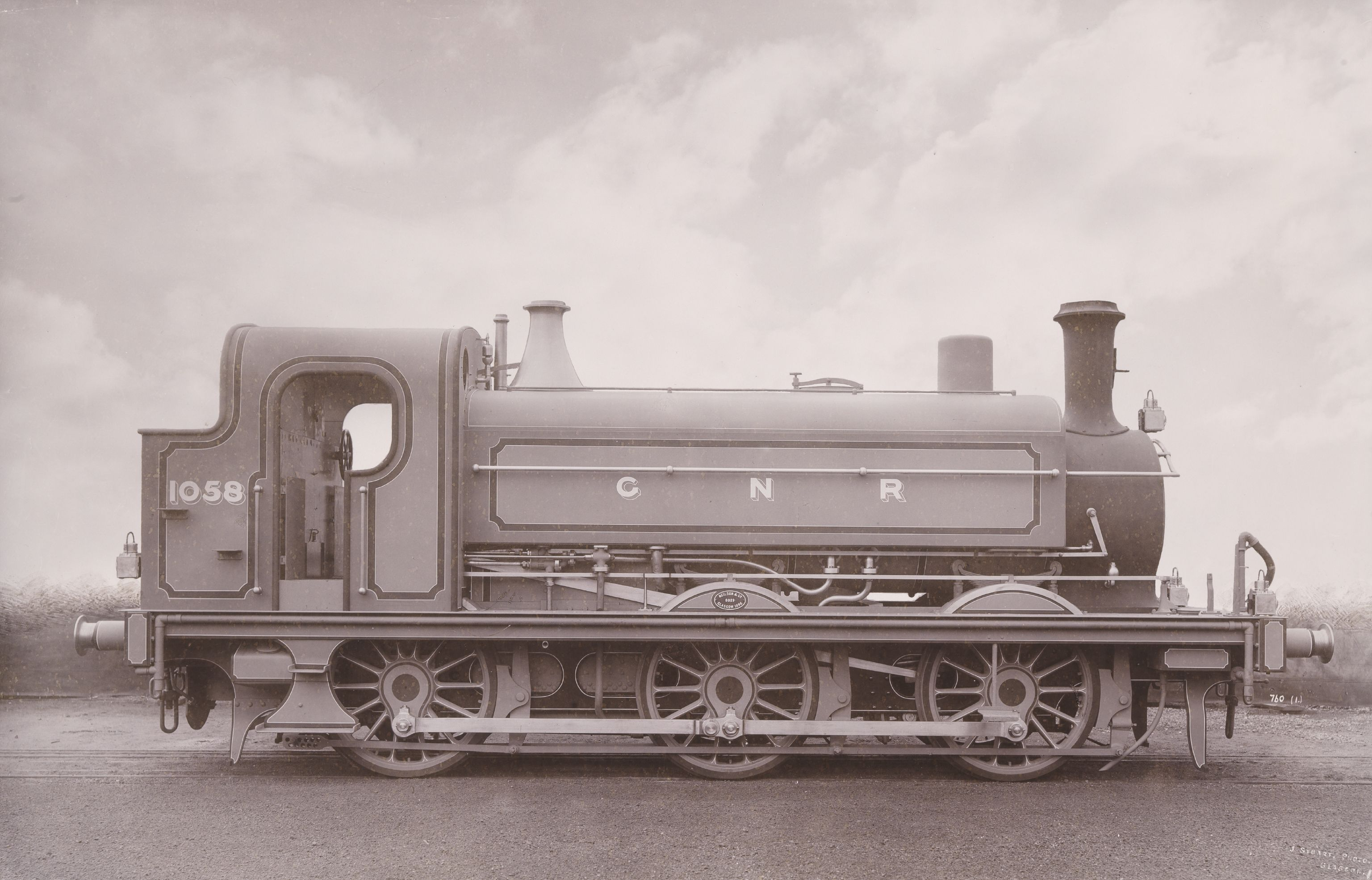
Type and origin
- Power type: Steam
- Designer: Patrick Stirling
- Builder: Neilson and Co (20) Doncaster (32)
- Build date: 1892-1897
- Total produced: 52
Specifications
- Configuration
  - Whyte: 0-6-0ST
- Length: 32 ft 9.5 in (9.995 m)
- Loco weight: 50.5 long tons (51.3 t; 56.6 short tons)
- Fuel type: Coal
- Fuel capacity: 3 long tons (3.0 t; 3.4 short tons)
- Water cap.: 1,090 imp gal (5,000 L)
- Firebox
  - Grate area: 16 sq ft (1.5 m^{2})
- Boiler pressure: 150 to 160 psi (1,000 to 1,100 kPa)
- Cylinders: 2 (inside)
- Cylinder size: 18 in × 26 in (460 mm × 660 mm)
Performance figures
- Tractive effort: 19,177 to 20,456 lbf (85.30 to 90.99 kN)
Career
- Operators: Great Northern Railway; London and North Eastern Railway; British Railways
- Class: GNR: J14; LNER: J53
- Withdrawn: 1936-1961
- Disposition: Several rebuilt into J52s in the 1920s, remainder scrapped.

The Great Northern Railway J14, later classified as J53 under LNER service, was a class of 52 0-6-0ST locomotives designed by Patrick Stirling and built at Doncaster Works by Neilson and Co and between 1892 and 1897.

The J14s were similar to the GNR Class J13 albeit with different boilers and without a steam dome.

== Sub Classes ==
17 J14s were built with condensing equipment for the Metropolitan Railway while a further 10 had them retrofitted in 1900. All of these locomotives had extra lamp irons for Southern Railway running. These were later removed or added when the locomotives moved. Five J14s were rebuilt with G2 0-4-4 boilers (four of these were rebuilt as J13s between 1928 and 1932), while No. 3928 was withdrawn in 1935.
