= Crécy-la-Chapelle =

- Commune
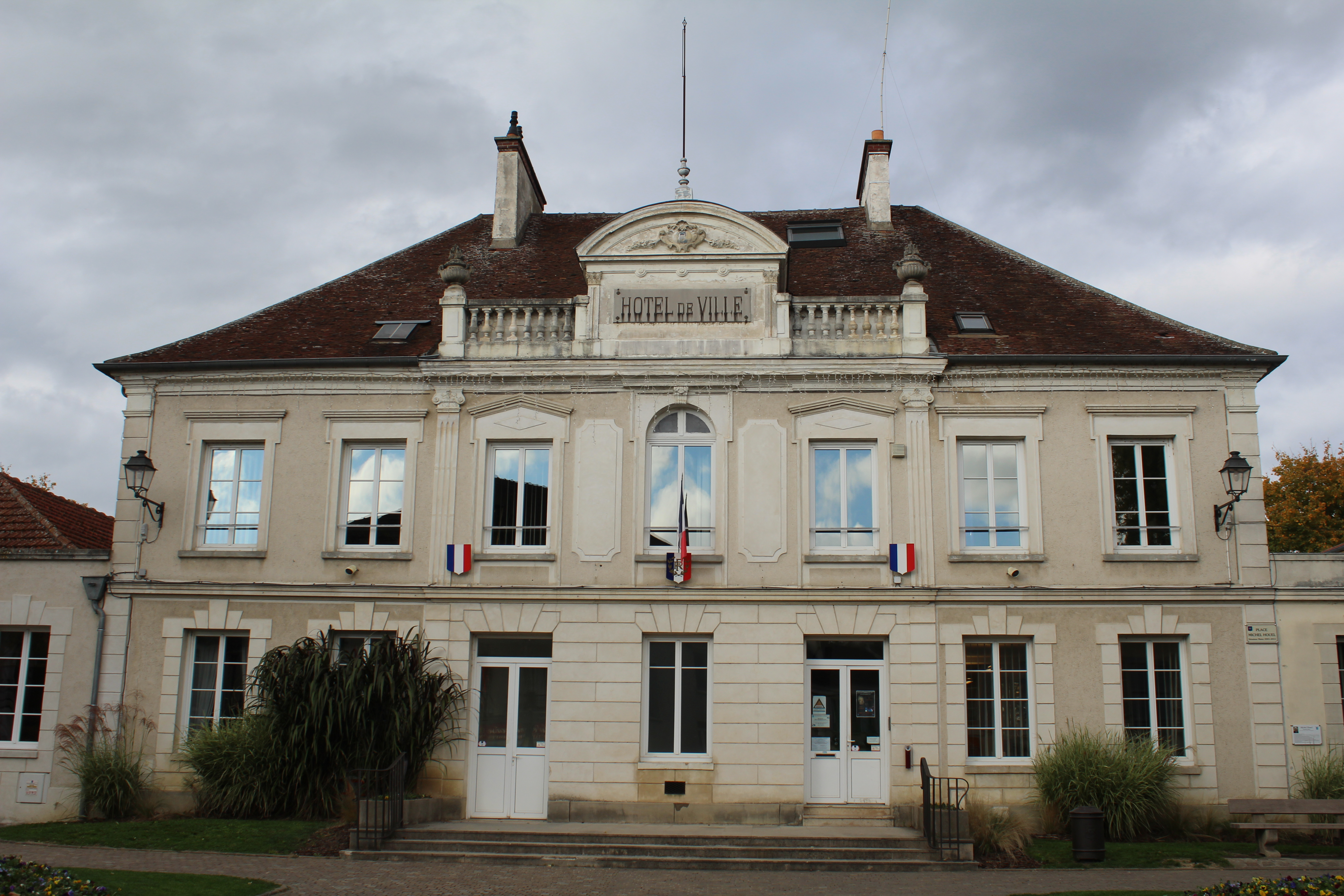
- The town hall in Crécy-la-Chapelle

- Coat of arms
- Location of Crécy-la-Chapelle
- Location within France Location within Île-de-France (region)
- Coordinates: 48°51′23″N 2°54′40″E
- Country: France
- Region: Île-de-France
- Department: Seine-et-Marne
- Arrondissement: Meaux
- Canton: Serris
- Intercommunality: CA Coulommiers Pays de Brie

Government
  - Mayor (2022–2026): Christine Autenzio
- Area^{1}: 15.78 km^{2} (6.09 sq mi)
- Highest elevation: 157 m (515 ft)
- Lowest elevation: 45 m (148 ft)
- Population (2023): 4,973
  - Density: 315.1/km^{2} (816.2/sq mi)
- Demonym: Créçois
- Time zone: UTC+01:00 (CET)
  - Summer (DST): UTC+02:00 (CEST)
- INSEE/Postal code: 77142 /77580
- Website: www.crecylachapelle.eu
- ^{1} French Land Register data, which excludes lakes, ponds, glaciers > 1 km^{2} (0.386 sq mi or 247 acres) and river estuaries.

Crécy-la-Chapelle (French pronunciation: [kʁesi la ʃapɛl]; lit. 'Crécy-the-Chapel') is a commune in the Seine-et-Marne department in the Île-de-France region in north-central France.

== Geography ==
Crécy-la-Chapelle is crossed by the river Grand Morin. The ground of the area is limestone. Crécy-la-Chapelle station has rail connections to Chelles and Paris.

Localities within the commune are Crécy Bourg, Montbarbin, Serbonne, la Chapelle-sur-Crécy, Libernon, Mongrolle, Férolles, Montaudier, la Grand-Cour, les Hauts-Soleil, le Choisiel, le Souterain, Montpichet.

== Population ==
Historical population
Year	Pop.	±% p.a.
1968	1,928	—
1975	2,193	+1.86%
1982	2,413	+1.38%
1990	3,222	+3.68%
1999	3,851	+2.00%
2007	4,056	+0.65%
2012	4,251	+0.94%
2017	4,531	+1.28%
2023	4,973	+1.56%
Source: INSEE

The inhabitants are called Créçois (masculine) and Créçoises (feminine) in French.

== Politics and administration ==
The town is twinned with Pielenhofen (Germany)

== Local culture and heritage ==
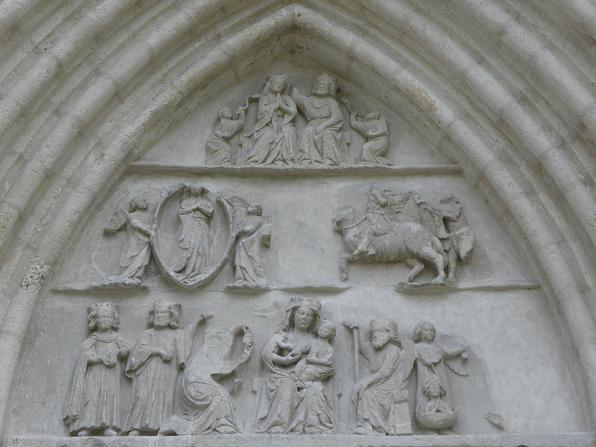
Tympanum on the occidental portal of the collegiate

=== Spots and monuments ===
- Collegiale Notre-Dame de Crécy-la-Chapelle, classified monument historique since 1846.
- Saint-Georges church.
- Beffroi.
- Quai des Tanneries.
- Tour aux Saints.
- War memorial for WW1 (Edme Marie Cadoux).
- The local museum is Musée de France, au sens de la loi No. 2002-5 du 4 January 2002; It is closed now (January 2013).
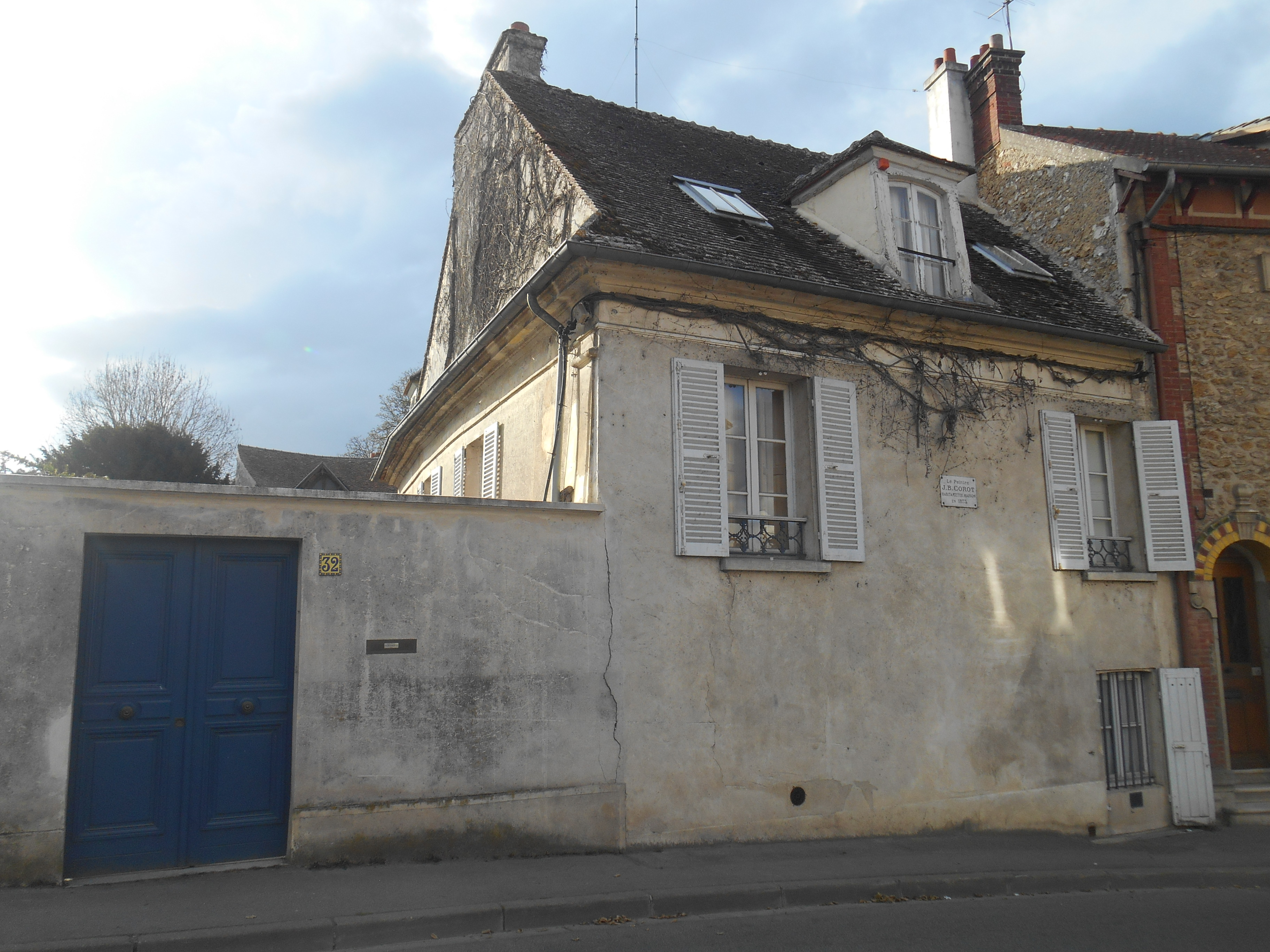
House where lived the artist Corot

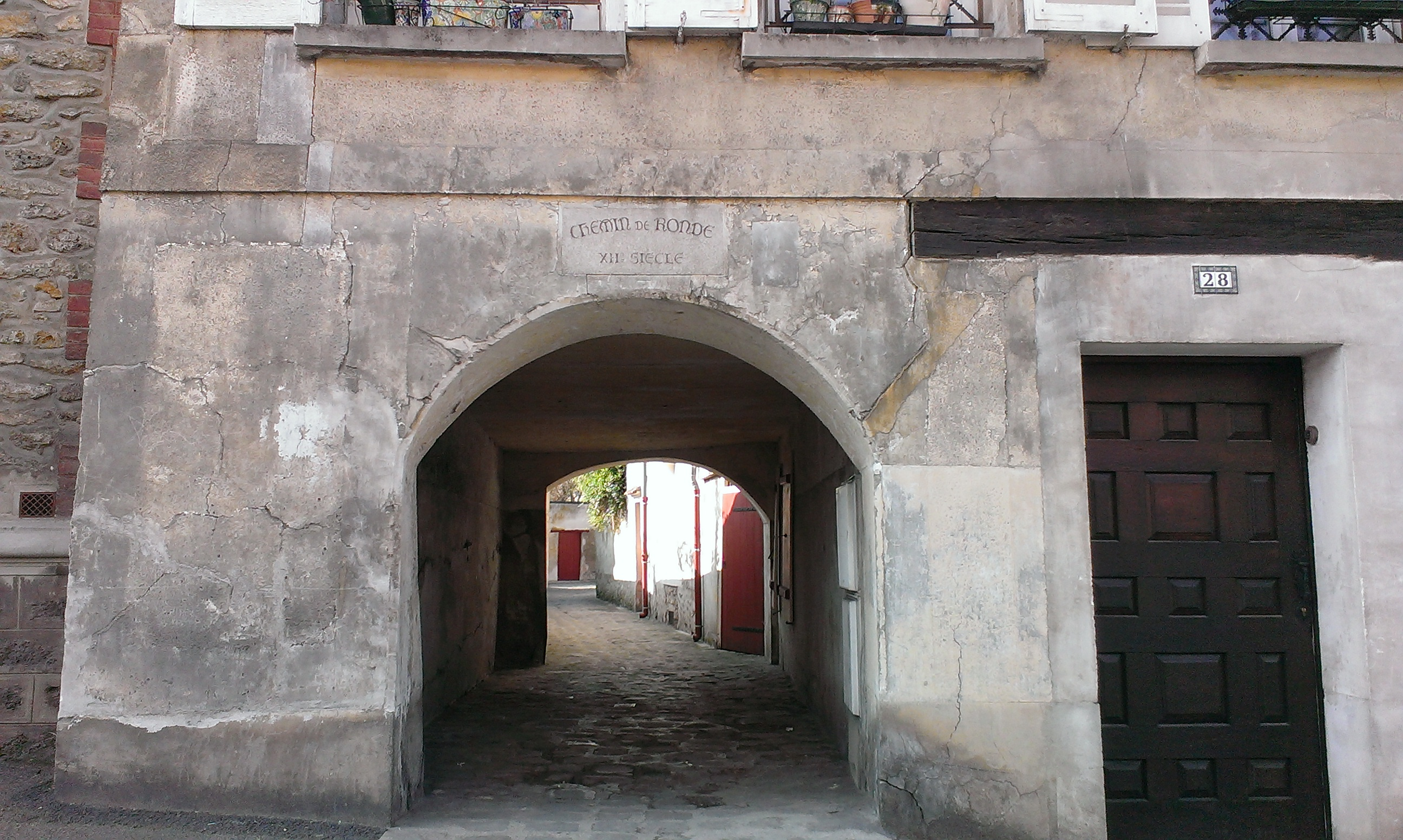
Wall walk

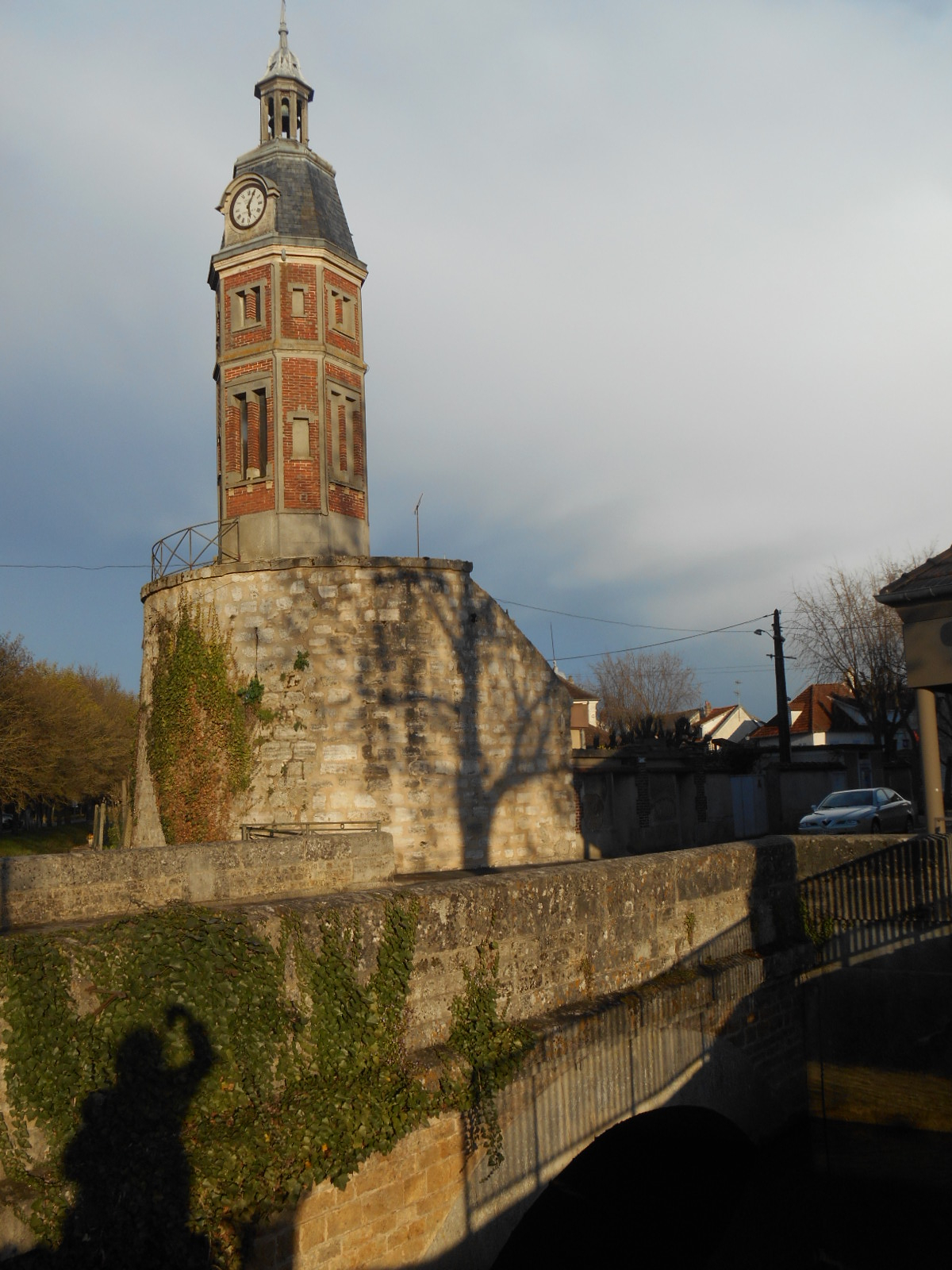
Belfry dating from the 19th century built on a tower dating from 12th century

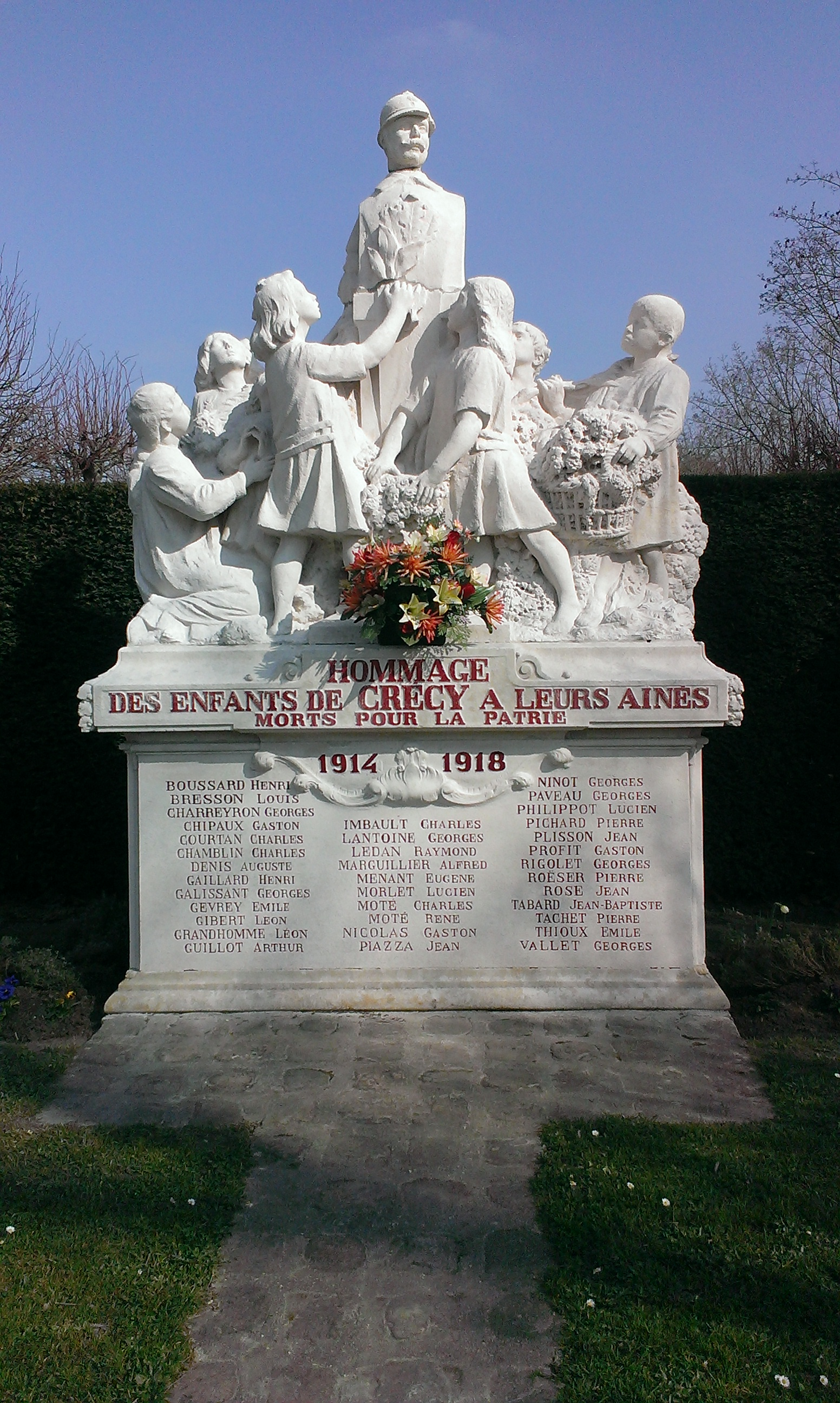
War memorial

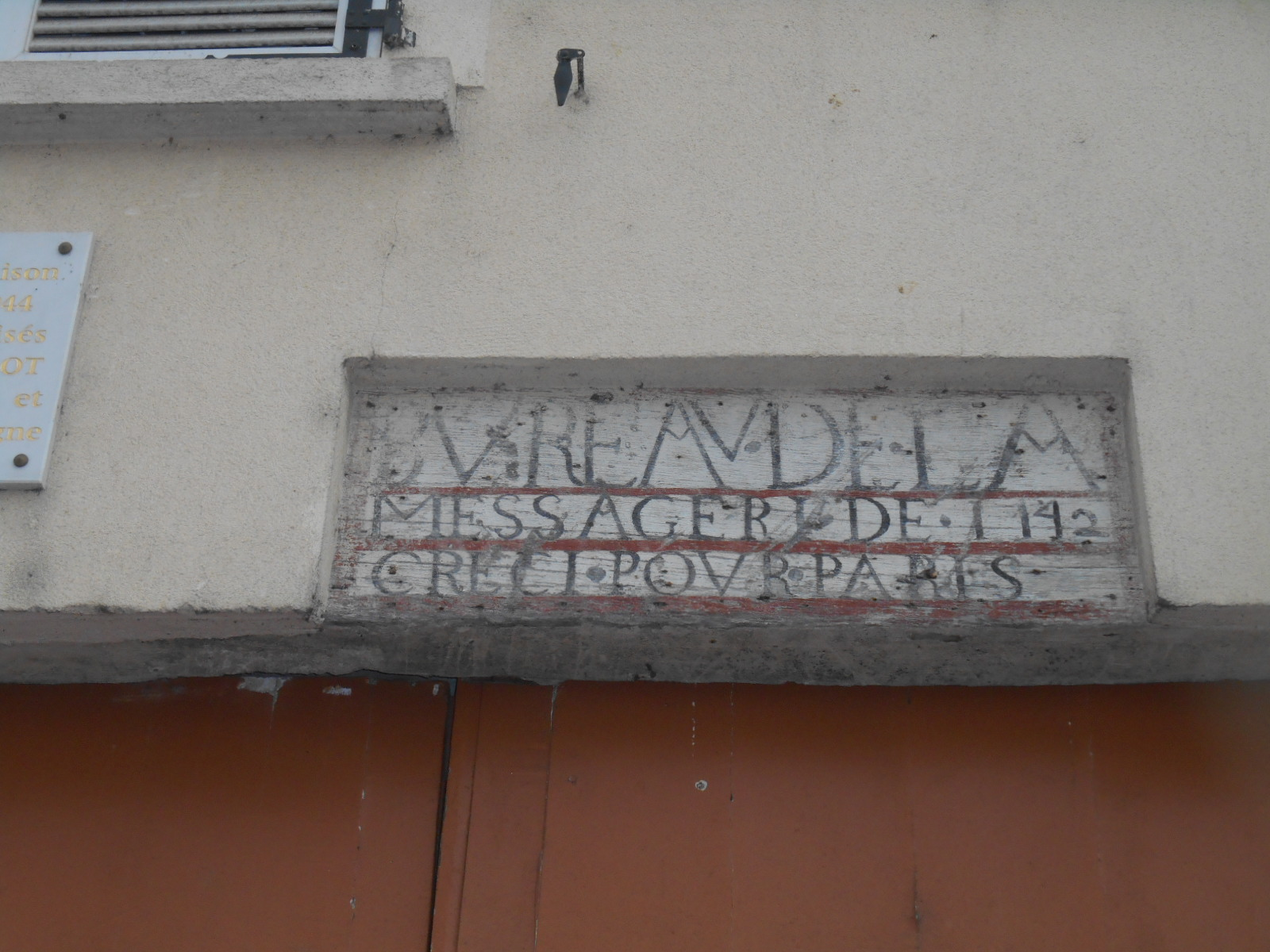
Vestige of the delivery service

== See also ==
- Communes of the Seine-et-Marne department
