= List of touch input manufacturers =

This is a list of notable companies that manufacture touch input devices or components.

== Touchscreens ==
=== Capacitive ===
- 3M
- Alps Electric Corporation
- Atmel
- Cirque
- Cypress
- SCHURTER Input Systems
- Synaptics

=== Projected capacitive (PCAP) ===
- 3M
- Planar
- SCHURTER Input Systems
- Visual Planet
- Zytronic

=== Surface acoustic wave (SAW) ===
- Planar

=== Bending wave ===
- 3M

=== Resistive ===
==== 4-wire ====
- Planar
- SCHURTER Input Systems

==== 5-wire ====
- SCHURTER Input Systems

== Touchpads ==
These manufacturers provide components to touchpads or trackpads.

=== Capacitive ===
- Alps Electric Corporation
- Cirque
- Synaptics
- Sensel

=== Resistive ===
- Interlink
