= Graham Cooley =

British entrepreneur and investor (born 1964)

Graham Cooley FIMMM FIET FEI
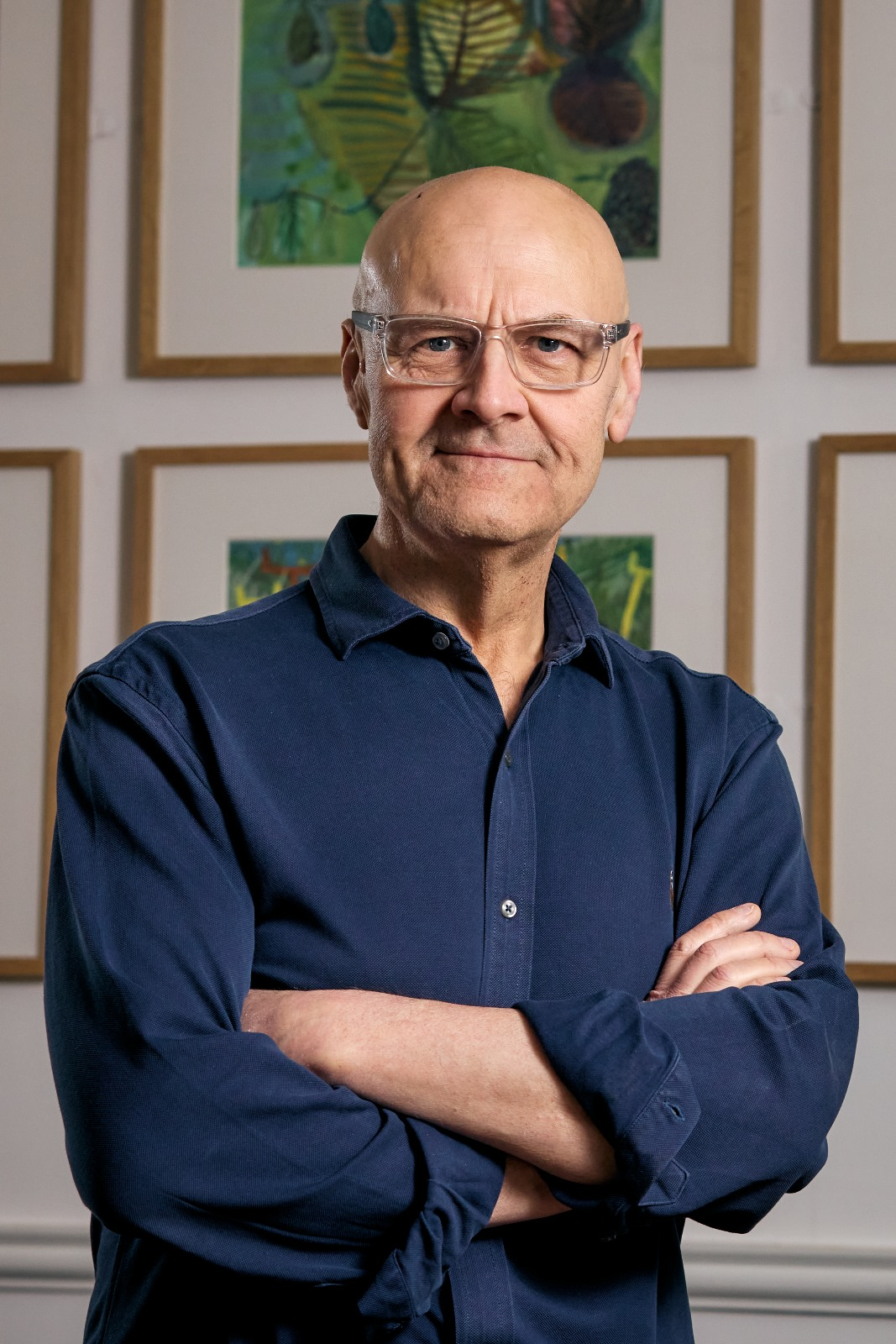
- Born: 1964 (age 61–62); Slough, England
- Education: University of Wales Institute of Science and Technology, Brunel University, University of Bradford, University of Oxford
- Occupations: Entrepreneur, investor
- Known for: Energy Storage & Cleantech Company Development
- Father: Mike Cooley

Graham Cooley (born 1964) is a British entrepreneur and investor, known for his contributions to energy storage and hydrogen technologies. Over a career spanning more than 35 years serving as leader in notable British companies, Cooley continues to play a significant role in the advancement of sustainable energy technologies.

== Early life and education ==
Graham Cooley was born in Slough, England in 1964 to Mike Cooley, an engineer, writer, and trade union leader and Shirley Cooley, a physics teacher. He studied physics at the University of Wales Institute of Science and Technology (now Cardiff University), earning a BSc (Hons) in 1985. He completed his PhD in Materials Physics at Brunel University in 1989, where he currently holds an honorary professorship. Cooley later pursued an MBA at the University of Bradford and a Diploma in Managing Innovation from the University of Oxford.

== Career ==
Cooley began his professional career at the Central Electricity Research Laboratory (CERL) in Leatherhead in 1989, working as an R&D Manager. Following the privatisation of the Central Electricity Generating Board (CEGB) in 1990, he joined National Power PLC, where he contributed to the development of the Regenesys energy storage technology. He later served as Business Development Manager at both National Power and International Power PLC.

In 2000, Cooley was appointed CEO of Antenova. During his leadership, Antenova secured £9.4 million in venture capital funding and expanded its wireless communication product offerings before it was later acquired by discoverIE in 2021.

Cooley subsequently became CEO of Metalysis in 2003, a University of Cambridge spin-out company which he relocated to The Hi-tech Manufacturing Hub in Rotherham, South Yorkshire. From 2007 to 2009, Cooley led Sensortec, Universal Sensors, and Cawood PLC, focusing on industrial diagnostics and biosensor technologies.

In 2009, Cooley was appointed by the Chairman Peter Hargreaves as CEO of ITM Power PLC, a manufacturer of electrolysers for green hydrogen production. Cooley raised almost £500 million for ITM and in 2021 opened the world’s largest electrolyser manufacturing facility in Sheffield. Cooley served as a member of the UK Government’s Hydrogen Advisory Council and chaired the ESG Committee at RenewableUK. In total he has raised over £650 million in funding for UK cleantech ventures.

Since 2023, Cooley has held several non-executive roles, including Director at Cadent Gas and Board Member of the Cadent Foundation. He is currently Chairman of Light Science Technologies Holdings Plc, Chairman of CAP-XX Ltd., Non-Executive Director of Gelion plc. and Chairman of BYOHM.

== Academic and professional recognition ==
Cooley holds the title of Honorary Professor at Brunel University, London and is Honorary Industrial Professor at the University of Bristol and Strategic Advisory Board Member of The Cabot Institute for the Environment. He was also appointed to the Strategic Advisory Board of the Sheffield Business School in June 2026.

He is a Fellow of the Institute of Materials, Minerals and Mining (FIMMM), the Institution of Engineering and Technology (FIET), and the Energy Institute (FEI). He received the Bessemer Society Lifetime Fellowship Award and has been named multiple times in the GreenFleet 100 list recognising his contributions to the decarbonisation of transport.

== Other activities ==
Cooley is a Trustee and Board Member of the Arcola Theatre, a Business Mentor for The King's Trust and the Institute of Directors and a Patron of the anti-litter charity CleanupUK.

== Personal life ==
Cooley divides his time between Yorkshire and Oxfordshire, where he lives with his wife and daughter.
