= CAP-XX =

Australian manufacturer of supercapacitors

CAP-XX Ltd
- Company type: Public Limited Company
- Traded as: LSE: CPX
- ISIN: AU0000XINAS1
- Industry: Supercapacitors
- Founded: 1997
- Founder: Anthony Kongats (Former CEO)
- Headquarters: Sydney, Australia
- Area served: Worldwide
- Key people: Dr Graham Cooley (Chairman), Lars Stegmann (CEO), Dr Alex Bilyk (CTO), Anthony Guana (Interim CFO)
- Products: Prismatic ultra-thin supercapacitors, coin-cell supercapacitors, Cylindrical supercapacitors, lithium-ion supercapacitors
- Revenue: ▲ A$4.6 million (2024)
- Operating income: ▼ – A$4.95million (2024)
- Net income: ▼ – A$5.99million (2024)
- Total assets: ▼ A$10.4million (2024)
- Total equity: ▼ A$4.61million (2024)
- Number of employees: ~ 24 (2024)
- Subsidiaries: CAP-XX (Australia) Pty Ltd. CAP-XX USA Inc. CAP-XX Research Pty Ltd.
- Website: www.cap-xx.com

CAP-XX Limited is an Australian based manufacturer of energy storage products for industrial IoT (sensors, smart devices, robotics), cloud computing (artificial intelligence data centers), automotive (electric vehicles), electrical grid, aerospace, and Defence Industry applications. CAP-XX maintains partnerships with universities for supercapacitor research & development (R & D). CAP-XX specialises in thin form factor (design) supercapacitor products. The company is also developing products such as the reduced Graphite Oxide (rGO) electrode to increase the energy density of supercapacitors, and Surface-Mount Technology (SMT) to enable the attachment of supercapacitors to PCBs in automated assembly lines compatible with reflow soldering. CAP-XX is publicly traded on the AIM market of the London Stock Exchange under the ticker symbol CPX.

== History ==
CAP-XX was founded in 1997 in Seven Hills, New South Wales, Australia, by Anthony Kongats. In 1994, Kongats was associated with a company called Energy Storage Systems Pty ltd founded in 1990 (now incorporated as CAP-XX ltd) which partnered with CSIRO to research and commercialise supercapacitor technology. Mr Kongats later used the research conducted with CSIRO to found CAP-XX along with the Intellectual Property that resulted from the partnership. The company specialised in energy-dense Double-layer capacitance for small electronic devices. In 2005 CAP-XX was selected for the World Economic Forum 2005 Technology Pioneers list.

In 2006 CAP-XX was admitted to the London Stock Exchange. In the early 2000s, CAP-XX began commercialising its supercapacitor products, servicing the consumer electronics for wearable technology. In 2008, CAP-XX entered into a licensing agreement with Murata, to manufacture Murata branded prismatic supercapacitors using CAP-XX's patents. In 2009, CAP-XX entered into a Manufacturing agreement with Nationwide Technologies of Penang, Malaysia.

In 2019, CAP-XX filed a lawsuit against Maxwell Technologies (owned by Tesla at the time but later sold to UCAP Power in 2021) for patent infringement of the electrodes used in its supercapacitors. In 2023, Tesla (which kept some energy storage patents that were previously owned by Maxwell Technologies) sued CAP-XX for the same reason.

In 2020, CAP-XX expanded its production capacity by acquiring the supercapacitor production line from Murata in Japan and transferring it to its Seven Hills, Sydney headquarters.

In 2022, CAP-XX had been selected as a Tier 1 supplier for Continental AG to provide the DMT220 prismatic supercapacitors. The sourcing agreement with Continental is expected to begin late 2024 through 2030

In 2023, CAP-XX announced a discounted placing and the exit of its founder / CEO, Anthony Kongats, effective May 2023. Subsequently in May 2023, a new CEO, Lars Stegmann, was appointed. By December 2023, CAP-XX had entered into a Joint Venture with an Australian Graphene technology specialist called Ionic Industries. The partnership is currently developing reduced graphite oxide (rGO) electrode technology. The aim of integrating Ionic's electrode nanotechnology with CAP-XX's Supercapacitors, is to increase the energy density of electrodes within supercapacitors. The rGO electrode technology was developed over the course of several years with Monash University.

In March 2024, the court ruled to settle the legal action between CAP-XX and Tesla. In June 2024, CAP-XX had appointed some new non-executive directors, including Dr Graham Cooley (former CEO of ITM Power). In July 2024, Schurter (majority owned by Capvis) signed a memorandum of understanding (MoU) to collaborate on a joint venture in developing supercapacitors under a unified brand, namely ultra-thin prismatic supercapacitors.

As of December 2024, CEO Lars Stegmann has made various changes to the company. However, the company remains focused on supercapacitor R&D, forming joint ventures to develop new product lines, and maintaining their supply chain & distribution network.

== Products and technology ==
CAP-XX produces a range of energy storage products, including:

- Ultra-thin prismatic supercapacitors: Features a compact form factor and ability to operate in harsh environments.
  - DMV: The 3 V, 750 mF, 21 × 14 × 2.2 mm supercapacitor.
  - DMH: The 4.5 V / 35 mF or 2.25 V / 140 mF, 20 × 20 × 0.4 mm supercapacitors.
  - DMF: The 5 V, up to 1 F (1000 mF), 30 × 14 × 3.7 mm supercapacitors.
  - DMT: The 4.2 V up to 470 mF, 21 × 14 × 3.5 mm supercapacitors.
- Cylindrical supercapacitors: from 0.5 F to 3000 F, for applications requiring higher energy density.
- Coin-cell supercapacitors: 0.5 F to 1.5 F.
- Lithium-ion hybrid supercapacitors: combining the energy density of lithium-ion batteries with the fast charge-discharge of supercapacitors (10 F to 220 F).
- Large microgrid modules: Stabilsing energy, managing fluctuations, and support renewables.
- Truck start modules: Providing quick, efficient electric power for vehicle startups.

Future products:

- Cylindrical surface-mount technology (SMT) for supercapacitors: new patents submitted 2024.
- rGO supercapacitors: development with Ionic Industries ongoing.

== Markets and applications ==
CAP-XX's supercapacitors have been utilised by businesses in various industries over the years, namely through licensing of its patented technology to large electronics manufacturers such as Murata, AVX Corporation, including:

- Smart meters: providing backup power and enabling efficient data transmission
- Automotive: supporting electrified systems and regenerative braking in electric and hybrid vehicles.
- IoT and wearable devices: efficient energy storage in compact designs.
- Renewable energy: supporting energy storage and grid balancing applications.
- Data centers: providing power when demand is high and charge when it is low, smoothing out power fluctuations.
- Marine propulsion systems: providing regenerative power management to ship propulsion systems

== Finances ==
When CAP-XX was founded in 1997 it received grants from the Australian government of around A$5.4million, and then received US$1million (1999) in seed capital. In the early 2000s, before CAP-XX went public, it raised an additional £17million (A$34million) during 2 funding rounds with investors such as Intel through its venture capital arm, Intel Capital. Since the CAP-XX IPO in 2006, the company has been a revenue generating business but has consistently made a loss over the years.

As of the end of financial year 2024, CAP-XX generated a revenue of A$4.6million (AUD) and made a loss after tax of A$6.0million. As a result, CAP-XX has completed a fundraise during a £2.5million placing offer, a £250k subscription offer, and a £275k exclusive retail offer, all issued at £0.0011. Thus, CAP-XX has raised a total of £3.025million (or A$6.014million) for the 2025 financial year. In addition, CAP-XX is due to receive a R&D tax rebate of A$1.25million from Australia in January 2025.
