= St John's Innovation Centre =

Business incubator in Cambridge, United Kingdom

Coordinates: 52.2351°N 0.1536°E

St John's Innovation Centre (SJIC) is a business incubator in Cambridge, England. It houses a concentration of science and technology related businesses.

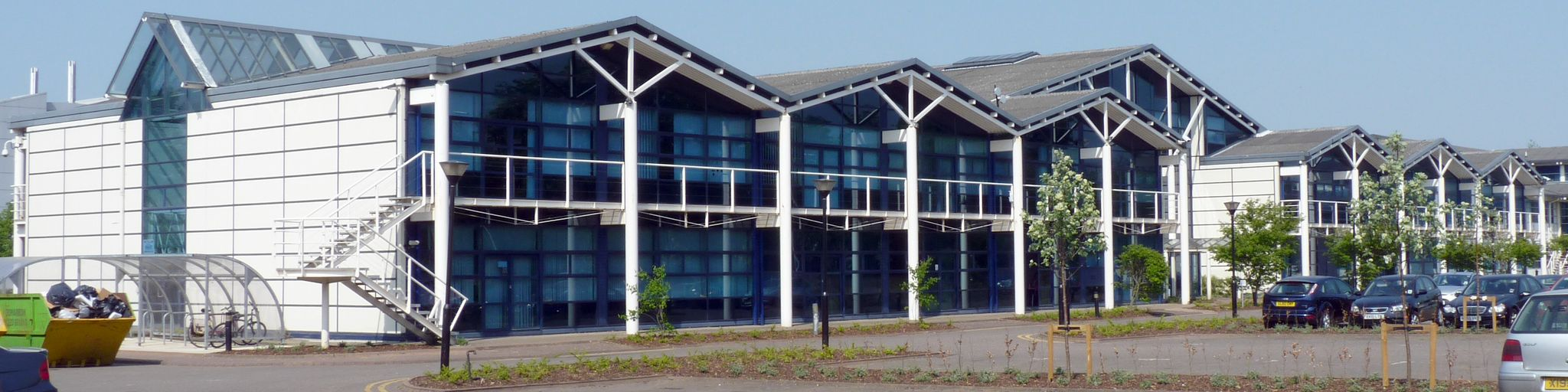
St John's Innovation Centre in April 2011

== History ==
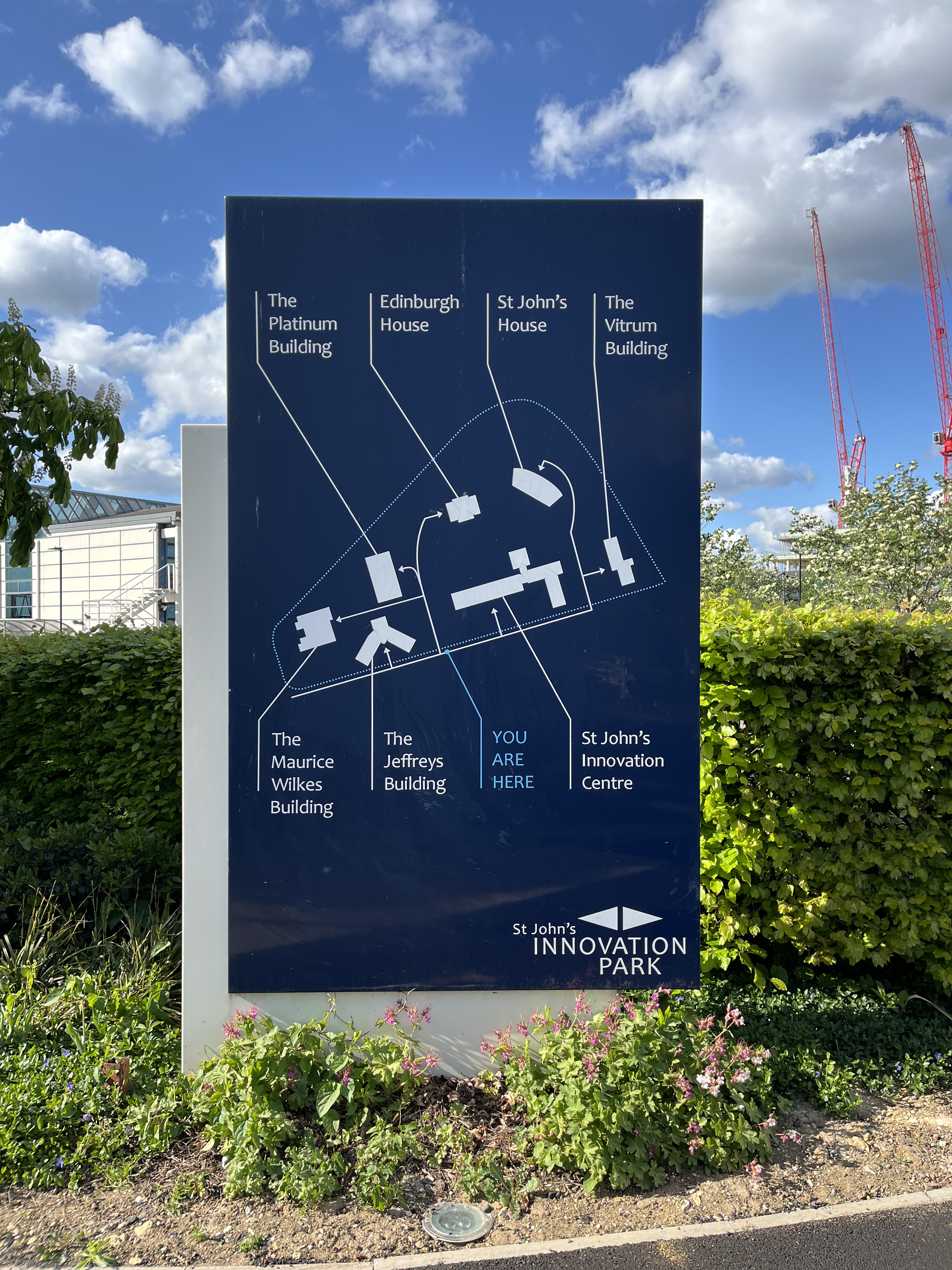
St John's Innovation Park site sign

The idea for the innovation centre was first proposed by Dr Chris Johnson, who was Senior Bursar of St John's College, Cambridge, responsible for estates, investments and financial policy. The combination of his scientific background and an interest in the development of college land in Cambridge led to a visit in 1984 to universities and science parks in the US, including an innovation centre in Salt Lake City, Utah. Upon his return he convened a small group including architect Ian Purdy and Walter Herriot, a banker working with early-stage companies, to plan the St John's Innovation Centre. The publication in 1985 of The Cambridge Phenomenon: The Growth of High Technology Industry in a University Town by Segal Quince Wicksteed, demonstrated to the college that investment in this sector was likely to be successful.

St John's Innovation Park was subsequently established on a 21-acre (85,000 m^{2}) plot of land owned by St John's College since 1534, and the Innovation Centre itself was completed in 1987. It was the first innovation centre in Europe to focus on supporting knowledge-based businesses. It is the oldest such business incubator in the United Kingdom.

A second phase, Dirac House was completed in July 1989, and the self-contained Jeffreys Building was completed in February 1990. Dirac House is named after Paul Dirac, Nobel Prize winner and member of St John's College, while the Jeffreys Building is named after Sir Harold Jeffreys, a fellow of St John's College.

The current total net usable space is approximately 53,000 sq ft (4,900 m^{2}), divided between the buildings.

== Location ==
St John's Innovation Centre is located approximately 3 km to the north of Cambridge city centre, close to junction 33 of the A14, and around 700 metres from Cambridge Science Park.

St John's Innovation Centre is located squarely within the area known as Silicon Fen.

== Cambridge Technopole ==
St John's Innovation Centre was the initiator of the Cambridge Technopole Group – an informal network of business support organisations operating in the Greater Cambridge region.

== Tenants ==
Although most of the centre's tenants are start-up and early-stage companies operating in a wide range of leading-edge technologies, there are some long-standing residents who have maintained offices despite expanding to other locations, both within the UK and internationally. Around 60 companies are located on the site, employing over 300 people. Over a five-year period the survival rate for companies is over 88%, compared to about 50% for other similar businesses in the Cambridge area, and 45% for businesses generally in the UK.

== Alumni ==
The following companies started life in St John's Innovation Centre:

- Autonomy Corporation plc, the enterprise software company. Revenue for year ending 31 December 2008 was around £310 million ($503.2 million).
- Bioprogress, now Meldex, develops biodegradable films for the pharmaceuticals market.
- Cachelogic, now Velocix, specialises in content delivery networks. It is backed by Amadeus Capital Partners, 3i plc and Pentech Ventures. Velocix has subsequently been acquired by French telecommunication firm Alcatel-Lucent.
- Jagex, developers and publishers of online computer games, including RuneScape and FunOrb, played by over 200 million users.
- Jobstream Group Plc, developers of Jobstream 9, a software platform used worldwide by the offshore fiduciary industry for trust and company admin, accounting and practice management. The company was founded in 1993 and still holds an office in the St John's Innovation Centre.
- Metagenerics, part of the Generics Group, now Sagentia.
- Owlstone Nanotech, developers of a button-sized programmable chemical sensor. In March 2009 the company was awarded a contract by the United States Department of Defense valued at $1.4 Million.
- Red Gate Software, developers of software tools for database administrators and developers.
- Splashpower, a wireless power development company. Founded in 2001, it was acquired by Fulton Innovation in May 2008.
- Symbionics, a technology development company founded in 1987 and acquired by Cadence Design Systems, Inc. in March 1998.
- Technetix Group, the broadband network equipment manufacturer. The company now operates in 21 countries selling to 91 countries worldwide. Revenue for the year ending 2016 was £118.5m.
- True Knowledge, developers of an ‘Internet Answer Engine’. The company raised almost £3 million in venture funding between start-up in 2006 and 2008.
- Visual Planet, developer of through-glass touch screens. The company was a virtual tenant of SJIC.
- Wacom Components Europe Ltd. WCE developed the W8002 ASIC that was designed into the Samsung Galaxy Note range of Smartphones.
- Zeus Technology, a software development company founded in 1995.
