= DiscoverIE Group =

Independent electronic components designer, manufacturer and supplier

discoverIE Group plc
- Type: Public
- Traded as: LSE: DSCV; FTSE 250 component
- Industry: Electronics
- Founded: 1986; 40 years ago
- Headquarters: Guildford, Surrey, United Kingdom
- Area served: Worldwide
- Key people: Bruce Thompson, (Chairman); Nick Jefferies, (CEO); Simon Gibbins, (CFO); Greg Davidson, (General Counsel)
- Products: Electronic components
- Revenue: ▲£443.3 million (2026)
- Operating income: ▲£45.2 million (2026)
- Net income: ▲£29.0 million (2026)
- Website: www.discoverieplc.com

discoverIE Group is a British designer and manufacturer of customised and niche electronic components for industrial use. It is listed on the London Stock Exchange and is a constituent of the FTSE 250 Index.

The company globally supplies specialized components to OEMs via two segments: Magnetics & Controls (M&C) and Sensing & Connectivity (S&C). M&C focuses on industrial magnetic, power, computing, and control components, while S&C deals with industrial sensing and connectivity solutions. Products range from transformers, inductors, and chokes to trackballs, servo motors, and wireless antennas.

== History ==
=== Foundation and early days ===
The company was established as a supplier of electronic components known as Acal plc by businessman, John Curry, in November 1986.

In 1989, the company was floated on the London Stock Exchange, valuing the company at £18.4 million. It changed its name to Acal plc.

In 1999, it acquired Sedgemoor plc for £77.9 million in cash and stock deal. Acal offered £10.65 in cash and one new Acal share for every 30 Sedgemoor shares, representing an offer price of 50.8 pence a share.

In April 2002, Acal acquired ATM Parts Company Ltd. for an initial consideration of £8 million in cash.

In May 2003, the company completed the acquisition of a 70% stake in Computer Parts International from its management and 3i for approximately £5.8 million.

Acal sold its air conditioning and refrigeration business to Parker-Hannifin Corp. in a transaction valued at £8.3 million in July 2006.

The company sold Acal IT Solutions to Avnet Technology Solutions for £41 million in cash in December 2007.

=== 2008–2016 ===
In November 2008, Acal announced the appointment of Nicholas (Nick) Jefferies as its Chief Executive with effect from 5 January 2009. Jefferies has extensive experience in the electronics and component distribution industry. Since 2005, he has been with Electrocomponents plc.

Acal completed the acquisition of specialist electronic distributor BFi OPTiLAS International S.A.S. from Activa Capital, Avnet Inc. (NYSE: AVT), and other shareholders for €12.6 million in December 2009.

In July 2010, Simon Gibbins joined the company as Group Finance Director. Gibbins, a Chartered Accountant, was most recently Global Head of Finance and Deputy CFO at Shire plc. Prior to joining Shire in 2000, he spent six years with ICI plc in various senior finance roles, both in the UK and overseas. His earlier career was spent with Coopers & Lybrand in London.

In January 2011 the company acquired CompoTRON GmbH for €7.9 million net of cash from W Brack and B Lohmaier.

Acal acquired Swedish embedded systems maker Hectronic in June 2011.

In October of that same year, the company acquired MTC Micro Tech Components GmbH, a manufacturer of EMC shielding materials and metal parts for €3.5 million.

Acal completed the acquisition of Groupe Myrra, a producer of power supplies, inductors and transformers, for €11.3 million in April 2013.

In November 2013, the management team of eaf-gmbh along with other investors acquired eaf-gmbh from Acal plc for €4.4 million.

NVM Private Equity Limited and the management of Acal Enterprise Solutions Limited completed the acquisition of Acal Enterprise Solutions from Acal for £6 million in June 2014.

In June 2014, Acal agreed to acquire Trafo Holding AS ('Noratel') from Herkules Private Equity Fund and other shareholders for £73.5 million on a debt-free basis. The purchase was financed through a revolving credit facility of £70 million and cash from a £55 million rights issue. The deal was completed on 17 July 2014.

Acal acquired Foss As Fiberoptisk Systemsalg from Skjelsbæk Invest AS for approximately NOK 140 million in January 2015.

In October 2015, Acal announced the appointment of Tracey Graham and Malcolm Diamond as Non-Executive Directors with effect from 1 November 2015. Diamond is Executive Chairman of Trifast Plc and Non-Executive Chairman of Flowtech Fluidpower PLC. He was previously Managing Director of Trifast Plc (1984–2002), Senior Non-Executive Director of Dechra Pharmaceuticals Plc (2000–2010) and a Non-Executive Director of Unicorn AIM VCT plc (2004–2013). Graham is a Non-Executive Director of Dialight Plc and of Royal London Mutual Building Society and was formerly a Non-Executive Director of Albermarle and Bond Holdings Plc (2011–13). Tracey has previously held senior executive roles as Chief Executive of Talaris Limited from 2008 to 2010 and Managing Director of De La Rue Cash Systems from 2005 to 2008.

In November 2015, the company acquired Flux A/S, a designer and manufacturer of custom-made inductors, transformers, and power supplies, for DKK 39 million. Flux reported a revenue of DKK 89 million, EBIT of DKK 7.2 million, and gross assets of DKK 53 million in 2014. The acquisition was funded from Acal’s existing debt facilities.

In January 2016, Acal acquired cable and connector companies Contour Electronics Asia Ltd and Contour Holdings Ltd. for £24 million. Contour reported revenues of £10.7 million, profit before tax of £1.8 million, and gross assets of £5.1 million for the year ended 30 June 2015.

Acal acquired Piltron Manufacturing, Inc. for CAD 4 million on a debt-free, cash-free basis in February 2016. Plitron reported sales for the year ended 31 May 2015 of CAD 8.2 million and gross assets of CAD 3.2 million.

In November 2016, Malcolm Diamond was appointed Non-Executive Chairman with effect from 1 April 2017. He succeeded Richard Moon, who had served as Non-Executive Chairman since April 2005.

=== 2017–2026 ===
In January 2017, Acal acquired sensors company Variohm Holdings Ltd for £13.9 million. The initial consideration was funded by an equity placing of £14.1 million. Variohm Holdings reported audited revenues of £19.4 million, EBITDA of £2 million, gross assets of £7.5 million, and profit before tax of £1.6 million, for the year ended 30 April 2016.

Jeremy Morcom joined as Group Corporate Development Director and a member of the Group Executive Committee in March 2017. Previously, he served similar roles at FTSE 250 companies Spectris plc and Invensys plc.

In November 2017, the company changed its name from Acal to discoverIE Group plc ('discoverIE') and its London Stock Exchange stock ticker symbol to DCSV from ACL.

In January 2018, discoverIE appointed Bruce Thompson as Non-Executive Director, effective from 26 February 2018.

discoverIE acquired Santon Holland bv, an electro-mechanical switchgear specialist, for €49.5 million in February 2018.

In October 2018, discoverIE acquired trackballs and HMI provider Cursor Controls Limited from Maven Capital Partners UK LLP, Cursor Controls’ management team and a number of former managers for £19 million. For the year ended 31 December 2017, Cursor's revenues were £7.9 million, operating profit was £2.1 million, gross assets were £9.9 million on a reported basis.

In April 2019, discoverIE acquired non-contacting sensor specialist Positek Limited for £4.6 million and Hobart Electronics for £19.2 million. On 16 April 2019, discoverIE raised around £29 million via a placing to fund the acquisitions. Positek Limited reported revenues of £1.5 million and EBITDA of £0.6 million for its year ended 31 August 2018, and had gross assets of £1.3 million.

Clive Watson joined discoverIE Board as a Non-Executive Director and Chair of the Audit and Risk Committee in September 2019.

In October of that same year, discoverIE acquired Sens-Tech Ltd., an X-ray and light detector developer and manufacturer, for £70 million. Under the terms of the consideration, initial cash consideration of £58 million shall be paid and further contingent cash consideration of up to £12 million, payable subject to the achievement of certain profit growth targets over a three-year period.

In October 2020, discoverIE acquired Indiana-based specialist sensor designer and manufacturer Phoenix America Inc. for an upfront consideration of $11m with further contingent cash consideration of up to $1.5m. For the year ended 31 December 2019, Phoenix America reported $6.4m sales and $1.25m operating profit.

discoverIE agreed to acquire German specialist sensor manufacturer Limitor GmbH for €18 million in December 2020. For the year ending 31 December 2019, revenue of Limitor was €8.2 million, and total assets were €3.9 million. The transaction was completed in February 2021.

In May 2021, discoverIE acquired Control Products Inc ('CPI'), a New Jersey, US, based designer and manufacturer of custom, rugged sensors and switches, for £8m on a debt-free cash-free basis. Phoenix, Limitor, and CPI will operate under Variohm Holdings while retaining their own distinctive brand identities.

In August 2021, discoverIE was added to the FTSE 250 Index.

The company acquired Logic PD, Inc. ('Beacon EmbeddedWorks'), a provider of embedded System on Modules (SOMs) solutions, from Compass Electronics Group for £58.8 million, and wireless antenna provider Antenova Ltd. for £18.2 million in Sep 2021. The transactions were funded in part by a £55 million equity placing.

In November of the same year, discoverIE announced that it had agreed to sell its Custom Supply business Acal BFi UK Ltd. to H2 Equity Partners B.V. for £50 million on a debt free cash free basis, comprising an upfront payment £45 million and £5 million of deferred consideration. For the year ended on 31 March 2021, Acal BFi reported revenue of £148.7 million and gross assets of £60.1 million. The sale marked the company exiting the distribution business and solely focusing on design and manufacturing.

In January 2022, Rosalind Kainyah MBE joined discoverIE Board as a Non-Executive Director.

In March 2022, discoverIE completed the sale of its distribution arm Acal BFi to H2 Equity Partners for £50 million on a debt-free cash free basis. The sale marked the company’s exit of the distribution business and solely focusing on design and manufacturing.

In July 2022, the company acquired Custom Design Technologies ('CDT') group, a designer and manufacturer of customised plastic enclosures, membrane keypads and associated electronic components for £5 million.

In January 2023, discoverIE acquired Magnasphere, a US-based designer and manufacturer of high-performing magnetic sensors and switches for access control, data centres, and specialist vehicles for USD 22 million.

In June 2023, Celia Baxter joined discoverIE Board as Non-Executive Director.

In August 2023, the company acquired UK-based Silver Telecom Limited ('Silvertel'), a designer and manufacturer of Power-over-Ethernet components, for an initial consideration of £21 million and an earn-out of up to £23 million, subject to Silvertel’s performance over the next four years.

In September 2023, discoverIE acquired Slovakia-based 2J Antennas Group for a cash consideration of EUR 52.5 million.

In January 2025, discoverIE agreed to acquire German precision sensors company Burster for an initial cash consideration of EUR 30.6 million and an earn-out of up to EUR 12.4m if Burster meets financial performance targets by the end of 2025.

In December 2025, it was announced discoverIE had acquired the Mengeš, Slovenia-headquartered antenna manufacturer Trival Antene d.o.o., for €52.65m.

In May 2026, discoverIE announced it has acquired a 90% interest in the Ontario, Canada-based electromagnetic shielding designer and manufacturer 3Gmetalworx ('3G') for £50 million. 3G reported revenue of £14.5 million for 2025.
