= Schurter =

Schurter Holding AG
- Company type: Private Limited Liability Corporation
- Industry: Electronic Components
- Founded: 1933, incorporated 1949
- Founder: Heinrich Schurter
- Headquarters: Lucerne, Switzerland
- Key people: Lars Brickenkamp, CEO
- Revenue: ▼232 million CHF (2024)
- Number of employees: 1500
- Website: www.schurter.com

Schurter Holding AG is a Swiss multinational manufacturer of electrical and electronic components and a provider of electronic services which is based in Lucerne, Switzerland.

17 companies in 14 countries belong to the SCHURTER Group, 8 companies of which have their own production sites

== History ==
The Schurter company was founded in 1933 by Heinrich Schurter as a limited partnership and was converted into a stock corporation in 1949. In 1990 Schurter Holding AG, which still exists today, was founded in Lucerne (Switzerland). Today, Schurter employs around 1500 people in 14 countries worldwide. Since December 2023, Lars Brickenkamp has been the Chief Executive Officer (CEO) of Schurter Holding AG. In 2024, Schurter Group had officially expanded its product line into the Supercapacitor industry, through a strategic technology partnership with CAP-XX (a London Stock Exchange listed, Australian supercapacitor manufacturer). The new supercapacitor product line became available to Schurter's clients in February 2025.

== Group Companies ==
The Schurter Group comprises 17 companies in 14 countries.

Group Company	Location	Country
SCHURTER AG	Lucerne	Switzerland
SCHURTER spol. s.r.o.	Zelezny Brod	Czech Republic
SCHURTER Electronics Pvt. Ltd.	Vadodara	India
SCHURTER Electronics Ltd.	Shenzhen	China
SCHURTER SAS	Arc-en-Barrois	France
SCHURTER Electronics SpA	Lainate	Italy
SCHURTER Electronics Ltd.	Aylesbury	Great Britain
SCHURTER Inc.	Santa Rosa	USA
SCHURTER + OKW do Brasil Componentes Electronicos Ltda	Sao Paulo	Brazil
Chi Lick Schurter Ltd.	Hong Kong	China
SCHURTER GmbH	Endingen	Germany
SCHURTER Electronics Sp. z o.o.	Warsaw	Poland
SCHURTER Electronics B.V.	Hardenberg	The Netherlands
CABEX Kft.	Mosonszentmiklós	Hungary
SCHURTER electronic, spol.s r.o.	Jihlava	Czech Republic
Burisch Elektronik Bauteile GmbH	Vienna	Austria

== Products ==
The Schurter Group is a Swiss technology company that develops and manufactures components and systems designed to ensure a clean and safe supply of power and facilitate ease of use.

The company produces and distributes a wide range of electronic components, including circuit protection devices, connectors, switches, EMC products, energy, and lighting solutions for railway applications. In collaboration with its customers, Schurter also designs and manufactures human-machine interface (HMI) solutions.

As of 2024, Schurter signed a strategic technology partnership with CAP-XX to bring their Supercapacitor technology into the Schurter product line.

== See also ==
- List of touch-solution manufacturers
