= Sanmina Corporation =

American company

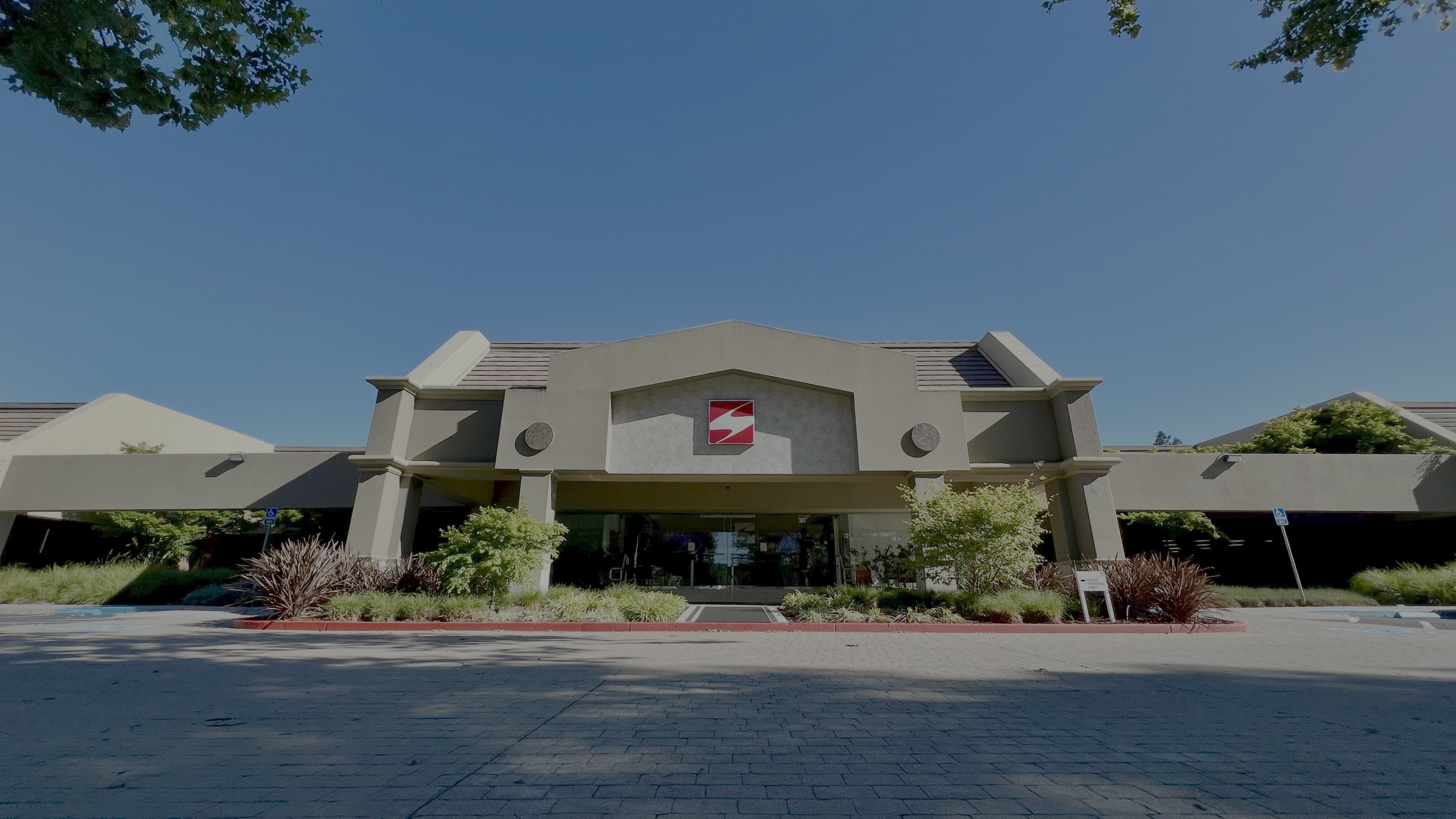
- Type: Public
- Traded as: Nasdaq: SANM; S&P 400 component
- Industry: Electronics Manufacturing Services; Original design manufacturers
- Founded: 1980; 46 years ago
- Founder: Jure Sola; Milan Mandarić
- Headquarters: San Jose, California, U.S.
- Key people: Jure Sola (chairman and CEO)
- Revenue: ▲US$8.13 billion (2025)
- Operating income: ▲US$355 million (2025)
- Net income: ▲US$246 million (2025)
- Total assets: ▲US$5.86 billion (2025)
- Total equity: ▲US$2.54 billion (2025)
- Number of employees: c. 39,000 (2025)
- Divisions: Viking Technology, SCI, Viking Enterprise Solutions, 42Q MES, ZT Systems
- Website: sanmina.com

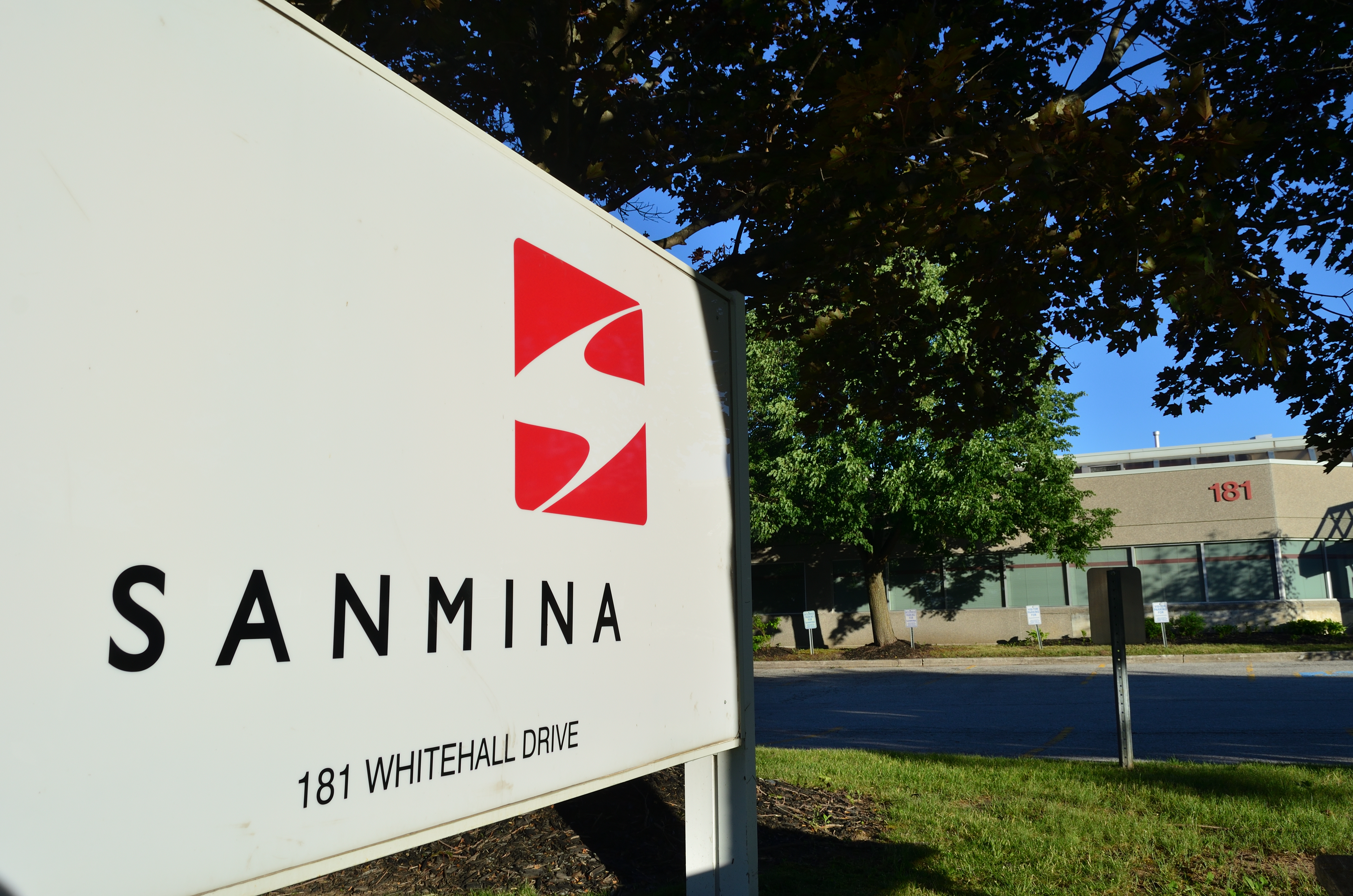
Sanmina office in Markham, Ontario

Sanmina Corporation is an American electronics manufacturing services (EMS) provider headquartered in San Jose, California that serves original equipment manufacturers (OEMs) in communications and computer hardware fields. The firm has nearly 80 manufacturing sites, and is one of the world’s largest independent manufacturers of printed circuit boards and backplanes. As of 2026, it is ranked number 471 in the Fortune 500 list.

== History ==
=== Founding and early years ===
Sanmina was founded by Jure Sola and Milan Mandarić in 1980 as a manufacturer of printed circuit boards. It later expanded into manufacturing backplanes and backplane subassemblies. By 1989 the company's revenue had grown to around $60 million and it was focused on providing electronics manufacturing services for several customers in the telecommunications industry. That year, Sola led a management buy-out of his co-founder's share in the company with investment from Morgan Stanley and became its president.

=== Initial growth: 1990s ===
In 1991, Sola became Sanmina's chairman and CEO. In the 1990s original equipment manufacturers (OEMs) had increasingly begun outsourcing production to firms like Sanmina. Sola was able to grow the company in the early 1990s by focusing on providing contract manufacturing, and Sanmina established itself as an electronics manufacturer for OEMs. The company increased its annual revenue by more than $20 million over the 5 years following the management buy-out. In February 1993, the company went public.

Through the 1990s the company expanded its operations in the US and internationally through acquisitions of electronics manufacturers and manufacturing services companies. Between 1993 and 2000, Sanmina bought manufacturing assets from Golden Eagle Systems and Lucent Technologies, acquired Comptronix, Pragmatech, Hadco and Altron and merged with Elexys International.

In 1997, the company was ranked the ninth largest contract manufacturer. It had taken advantage of the growth in telecommunications in the 1990s by focusing on providing manufacturing services for customers from that industry. Sanmina focused on manufacturing products that were harder for client companies to make themselves, such as components for premium networking and telecommunications applications. By 2000, the company had expanded into manufacturing for the mobile communications, high-tech, and medical instrumentation industries. In 2001, manufacturing for telecommunications clients made up 70 percent of the company's revenue.

By April 2001, the company had around 20,000 employees and operated 75 facilities in 13 countries. In 2001 the company was affected by the downturn in the technology industry. Sanmina's sales decreased by 20% in early 2001 and it made layoffs and closed some US facilities, however its revenue continued to increase, which was credited to the company's focus on higher margin products for the telecommunications industry.

=== Global expansion: 2000s ===
In 2001, the company acquired and merged with SCI Systems, a larger competitor with operations in the US and Europe. SCI was founded in 1961 as Space-Craft Inc. and became a supplier to the defense and aerospace industries before diversifying into contract manufacturing for private companies. At the time of the merger, SCI manufactured a broader range of products compared with Sanmina, including a focus on assembling personal computers (PCs). Although SCI was the larger company with higher revenues, Sanmina had a higher market valuation, which allowed it to buy SCI. The companies completed the merger in December 2001, establishing Sanmina-SCI Corporation as the resulting combined company. The acquisition of SCI was the largest acquisition in the electronics manufacturing services industry to that date and made Sanmina-SCI the joint second-largest EMS company.

After the merger, the company restructured and broadened its customers to be spread over a wider range of markets by the mid-2000s. In the early and mid-2000s Sanmina-SCI, the company closed some US facilities and expanded its international operations in Asia as it moved some manufacturing abroad. The ongoing downturn in the technology industry, and the company's post-merger reliance on the lower-margin PC manufacturing business affected the business. The company sought to reduce costs by moving manufacturing to countries with lower cost of labor. In 2008, Sanmina-SCI decided to exit the PC manufacturing business citing its low margins. The company sold its PC manufacturing operations to Foxconn and a manufacturing plant in Mexico to Lenovo. After the sale of the PC business, Sanmina-SCI focused on developing strong relationships with OEMs as well as drawing from SCI's experience with defense contracts to focus on the defense industry. As of the late 2000s, the company's defense and aerospace operations were headquartered in the Huntsville, Alabama area, where it manufactured technologies such as battlefield communications systems for clients including Boeing and General Dynamics.

=== 2010s ===
As of 2010, Sanmina-SCI had around 45,000 employees and operated facilities in 18 countries in Asia, North and South America and Europe.

The company changed its name to Sanmina Corporation in November 2012.

By the mid-2010s, the company had expanded into cloud computing infrastructure. In 2016, the company entered into a partnership with Nokia to provide design, manufacturing and logistics services for its data center services.

Sanmina closed several plants in 2018 and the company's stock price dropped after a major customer took production in house. The company closed a circuit board manufacturing plant in Owego, New York and planned to close two facilities in China. On May 11, 2018, Ather Energy, announced it had entered into an agreement with the company to develop and manufacture key components for its maiden scooter and production would take place in the company's facility in Chennai, India.

During the late 2010s the company had several changes in leadership. In 2017, Bob Elau became the company's CEO, succeeding Sola who became the company's executive chairman. In 2018, Michael Clarke became the CEO, followed by Hartmut Liebel in 2019. In 2020, Sola became the CEO of the company once more.

== Operations ==
Sanmina manufacturing facility in Guadalajara, MX in 2026

As of September 2025, the company reported operations in 20 countries and approximately 39,000 employees. The company's 19 North America manufacturing facilities include 15 in the US, two in Canada, and three in Mexico. The company's operations are organized into two businesses: Integrated Manufacturing Solutions; and Components, Products and Services. The Integrated Manufacturing Solutions business focuses on assembling, testing and order fulfillment for printed circuit boards. The Components, Products and Services business comprises the rest of Sanmina's operations, including its subsidiaries and divisions including Advance Microsystems Technologies, SCI, Viking Technology, Viking Enterprise Solutions, ZT Systems, and 42Q.

Sanmina's businesses manufacture products and provide manufacturing services for organizations in industries including automotive, communications, data center and cloud infrastructure, defence and aerospace, industrial, and medical.

The company is a contract manufacturer that designs and manufactures electronics products for its OEM clients to use to manufacture their products. Sanmina manufactures electronics and electronic components including circuit boards, servers, optical modules and fiber optics, components for solar power and medical devices.

In addition to making products for clients, the company develops manufacturing processes including establishing automated production lines. The company also provides manufacturing services for the development of new products including prototyping and testing, and provides services such as shipping and product repairs.

== Lawsuits ==
In 2023, it became known that Sanmina was engaged in ongoing litigation with its former partner, Dialight, concerning the termination of their manufacturing services agreement.

In 2024, the claims against Sanmina for fraudulent inducement proceeded to trial after a New York court rejected Sanmina’s bid to dismiss Dialight’s fraud allegations. In September 2024, Dialight lost its lawsuit and was ordered to pay Sanmina $8.7 million.
