= Zytronic =

British electronics company

Zytronic Plc
- Company type: Public limited company
- Traded as: AIM: ZYT
- Industry: Touchscreen technology
- Genre: Projected capacitive solutions
- Headquarters: Blaydon on Tyne, UK
- Area served: Worldwide
- Key people: Mark Cambridge (CEO); Tudor Griffith Davies (non-executive chairman)
- Revenue: £21.1 million (2016)
- Operating income: £4.3 million (2016)
- Net income: £4.1 million (2016)
- Website: Zytronic.co.uk

Zytronic was a manufacturer and developer of unique projected capacitive touch technology products based in Blaydon upon Tyne, United Kingdom.

Zytronic designed composite component touch technologies that optimised the performance of electronic display applications and manufactured projected capacitive technology based touch sensors and their associated controllers which were used in public access and industrial applications.

Zytronic supplied touch technology for use in a variety of heavy use, self-service touch interactive systems, and was selected by major companies, such as The Coca-Cola Company for Coca-Cola Freestyle machine, BSH Bosch and Siemens for some domestic appliances, Microsoft Envisioning Lab for an experimental multi-monitor workstation and also powered portable tablets in the Natural History Museum and payment terminals for bicycle rental stations as deployed in the City of London and a number of global cities.

== Corporate information ==
The Zytronic Group consists of two companies; the parent company is Zytronic Plc which was incorporated in 2000 and admitted to the London Stock Exchange Alternative Investment Market (AIM) in July 2000; and the operating subsidiary Zytronic Displays Limited.

Zytronic Displays Limited manufactures laminated optical products from radio frequency interference and electromagnetic interference (RFI/EMI) glass panels, optical displays used on ATMs, to other of electronic displays used in a wide variety of industries.

Since July 2000, Zytronic Displays Limited has developed technology relating to the operation of the touch sensors, the lamination techniques and processes, and developed a range of interactive touch sensor products based upon patented projected capacitive technology (PCT).

The Group operates from three factories in Tyne and Wear, UK with a representative and distributor network in 39 countries covering Americas, EMEA countries and APAC regions.

== Technology and applications ==
=== Touch Screen Technology ===
Zytronic touch sensor products employ an embedded sensing element and are based on projected capacitive technology. The PCT sensing mechanism that forms the basis of Zytronic’s touch sensors consists of a matrix of micro-fine copper capacitors embedded into a durable laminated glass composite. A special feature of this technology is its ability to operate through a thick protective overlay. As a result the touch display can be completely protected from external factors and has a far greater resistance to rough treatment of all forms – abrasion, shock, vibration, extreme heat levels, adverse weather conditions and exposure to harmful chemicals in contrast with other traditional touch sensing techniques, such as optical, acoustic, capacitive, infra-red or resistive screens.

=== Optical Filters ===
Optical filters are used to enhance the readability of all types of electronic displays by controlling light transmission, reflection and absorption. The filters can also provide protection of the display from abrasion and damage from impact thereby extending the life of the display, for example tinted or neutral density substrates/interlayers to improve contrast.

Customised optical filters enhance electronic display performance and minimise electromagnetic emissions by using micro-fine mesh or transparent conductive coatings for electromagnetic shielding. The conductive coatings are also used for static dissipation.

=== EMI and RFI shielded filters ===
A shielded window is the optimum solution for reducing radio frequency interference (“RFI”) and other electrical/magnetic interference (“EMI”) transmitted through monitors, LCD instrument panels and inspection windows fitted to electronic equipment.

=== Applications ===
Due to the high durability, environmental stability and ability to survive the everyday rigours of outdoor and indoor environments, PCT sensing mechanisms are used in a range of self-service applications such as entertainment and gaming applications, e.g. video jukeboxes, DVD vending machines, drive through restaurant kiosks, ATMs, petrol pumps, medical screens and industrial computers.

== See also ==
- Touchscreen
- Multi-touch
- Capacitive sensing
- Resistive touchscreen
- Optical filters
- Touch switch
- Human interface device
- Laminated glass
