= Sodium-ion capacitor =

Hybrid type of capacitor

A sodium-ion capacitor (SIC) is a hybrid type of supercapacitor that uses sodium ions for energy storage. It typically combines a battery-type anode with an activated carbon cathode. Sodium-ion capacitors are being investigated as alternatives to lithium-ion capacitors because of sodium's greater abundance and lower cost.
