= Lithium-ion capacitor =

Hybrid type of capacitor

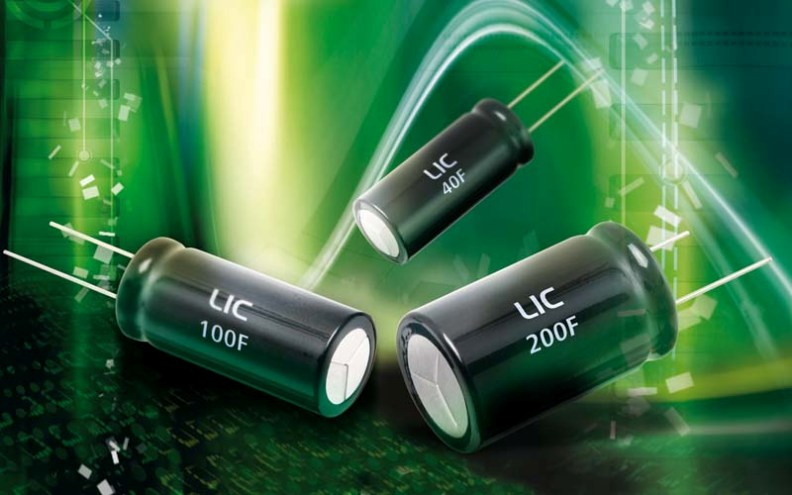
- Single-ended lithium-ion capacitors up to 200 F for PCB mounting
- Specific energy: 85 Wh/Kg (Commercial) Up to 262 W⋅h/kg (Experimental)
- Energy density: 10–15 W⋅h/L
- Specific power: 300–156000 W/kg
- Charge/discharge efficiency: 95%
- Self-discharge rate: < 5% per month (temperature dependent)
- Cycle durability: 100–75,000 over 90%
- Nominal cell voltage: 1.5–4.5 V

A lithium-ion capacitor (LIC or LiC) is a hybrid type of capacitor classified as a type of supercapacitor. It is called a hybrid because the anode is the same as those used in lithium-ion cells and the cathode is the same as those used in supercapacitors. Activated carbon is typically used as the cathode. The anode of the LIC consists of carbon material which is often pre-doped with lithium ions. This pre-doping process lowers the potential of the anode and allows a relatively high output voltage compared to other supercapacitors.

== History ==
In 1981, Dr. Yamabe of Kyoto University, in collaboration with Dr. Yata of Kanebo Co., created a material known as PAS (polyacenic semiconductive) by pyrolyzing phenolic resin at 400–700 °C. This amorphous carbonaceous material performs well as the electrode in high-energy-density rechargeable devices. Patents were filed in the early 1980s by Kanebo Co., and efforts to commercialize PAS capacitors and lithium-ion capacitors (LICs) began. The PAS capacitor was first used in 1986, and the LIC capacitor in 1991.

A significant breakthrough into the creation of a hybrid ion capacitor was made by a research group in 2001. Further research into improving electrode and electrolyte performance and cycle life led to a 2010 breakthrough by Naoi et al. by developing a nano-structured composite of LTO (lithium titanium oxide) with carbon nanofibers. Nowadays, another field of interest is the sodium-ion capacitor (NIC) because sodium is much cheaper than lithium. Nevertheless, the performance advantages of the LIC over NIC mean the latter is not yet economically viable.

== Concept ==
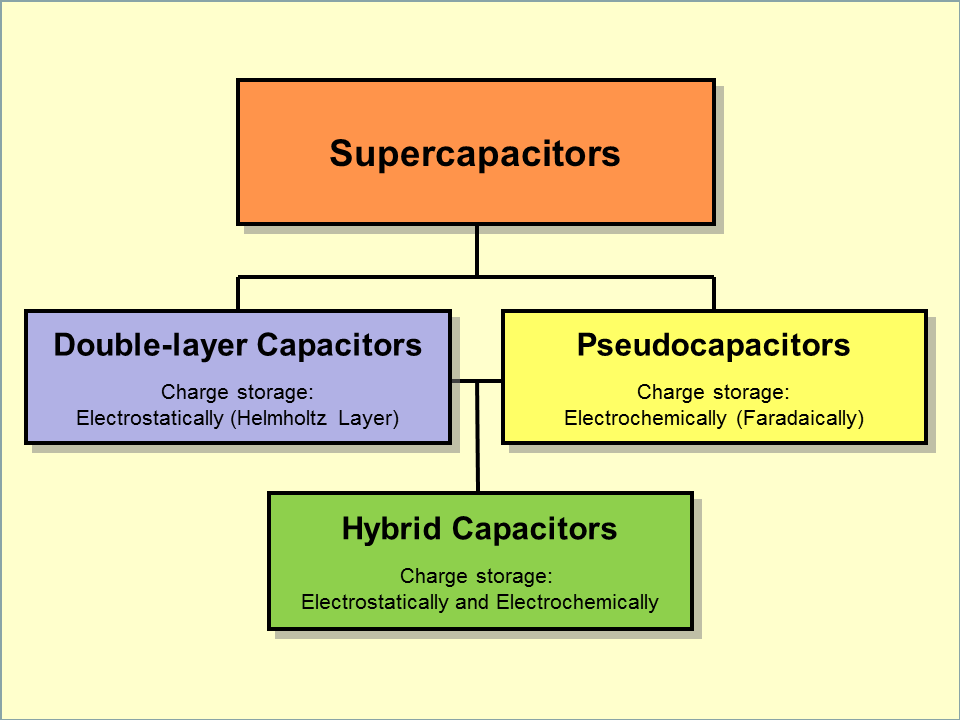
Hierarchical classification of supercapacitors and related types

A lithium-ion capacitor is a hybrid electrochemical energy storage device which combines the intercalation mechanism of a lithium-ion battery anode with the double-layer mechanism of the cathode of an electric double-layer capacitor (EDLC). The combination of a negative cell-type LTO electrode and a positive capacitor type activated carbon (AC) resulted in an energy density of ca. 20 W⋅h/kg which is about 4–5 times that of a standard Electric Double Layer Capacitor (EDLC). The power density, however, has been shown to match that of EDLCs, as it is able to completely discharge in seconds.

At the negative electrode (anode), for which activated carbon is often used, charges are stored in an electric double layer that develops at the interface between the electrode and the electrolyte. Like EDLCs, LIC voltages vary linearly adding to complications integrating them into systems which have power electronics that expect the more stable voltage of batteries. As a consequence, LICs have a high energy density, which varies with the square of the voltage. The capacitance of the anode is several orders of magnitude larger than that of the cathode. As a result, the change of the anode potential during charge and discharge is much smaller than the change in the cathode potential.

=== Anode ===
The negative electrode or anode of the LIC is the cell type or high energy density electrode. The anode can be charged to contain large amounts of energy by reversible intercalation of lithium ions. This process is an electrochemical reaction. This is the reason that degradation is more of a problem for the anode than for the cathode since the cathode is involved in an electrostatic process and not in an electrochemical one.

There are two groups of anodes. The first group are the hybrids of electrochemical active species and carbonaceous materials. The second group are the nanostructured anode materials. The anode of LIC's is basically an intercalation type cell material which has sluggish kinetics. However, in order to employ an anode in LICs, one needs to slightly incline their properties towards those of a capacitor by designing hybrid anode materials. The hybrid materials can be prepared using capacitor and cell type storage mechanisms. Currently, the best electrochemical species is lithium titanium oxide (LTO), Li_{4}Ti_{5}O_{12}, because of its extraordinary properties like high coulombic efficiency, stable operating voltage plateau and insignificant volume alteration during lithium insertion/desertion. Bare LTO has poor electrical conductivity and lithium ion diffusivity so a hybrid is needed. The advantages of LTO combined with the great electrical conductivity and ionic diffusivity of carbonaceous materials like carbon coatings lead to economically viable LIC's.

The electrode potential of LTO is fairly stable around −1.5 V versus Li/Li^{+}. Since carbonaceous material is used the graphitic electrode potential which is initially at −0.1 V versus SHE (standard hydrogen electrode) is lowered further to −2.8 V by intercalating lithium ions. This step is referred to as "doping" and often takes place in the device between the anode and a sacrificial lithium electrode. Doping the anode lowers the anode potential and leads to a higher output voltage of the capacitor. Typically, output voltages for LICs are in the range of 3.8–4.0 V but are limited to minimum allowed voltages of 1.8–2.2 V.

The nanostructured materials are metal oxides with a high specific surface area. Their main advantage is that it's a way to increase the rate capability of the anode by reducing the diffusion pathways of the electrolytic species. Different forms of nanostructures have been developed including nanotubes (single- and multi-walled), nanoparticles, nanowires, and nanobeads to enhance power density.

Other candidates for anode materials are being investigated as alternative to graphitic carbons, such as hard carbon, soft carbon and graphene-based carbons. The expected benefit, compared to graphitic carbons, is to increase the doped electrode potential which leads to improved power capability as well as reducing the risk of metal (lithium) plating on the anode.

=== Cathode ===
The cathode of LIC's uses an electric double layer to store energy. To maximize the effectiveness of the cathode it should have a high specific surface area and good conductivity. Initially activated carbon was used to make cathodes but in order to improve performance, different cathodes have been used in LIC's. These can be sorted into four groups: heteroatom-doped carbon, graphene-based, porous carbon, and bifunctional cathodes.

Heteroatom-doped carbon has as of yet only been doped with nitrogen. Doping activated carbon with nitrogen improves both the capacitance and the conductivity of the cathode.

Graphene based cathodes have been used because graphene has excellent electrical conductivity, its thin layers have a high specific surface area, and it can be produced cheaply. It has been shown to be effective and stable compared to other cathode materials.

Porous carbon cathodes are made similar to activated carbon cathodes. By using different methods to produce the carbon, it can be made with a higher porosity. This is useful because for the double layer effect to work the ions have to move between the double layer and the separator. Having a hierarchical pore structure makes this quicker and easier.

Bifunctional cathodes use a combination of materials used for their EDLC properties and materials used for their good Li^{+} intercalation properties to increase the energy density of the LIC. A similar idea was applied to the anode materials where their properties were slightly inclined towards those of a capacitor

=== Pre-lithiation (pre-doping) ===
The anode of LIC's is often pre-lithiated in order to prevent the anode from experiencing a large potential drop during charge and discharge cycles. When a LIC comes near its maximum or minimum voltage the electrolyte and electrodes start to degrade. This will irreversibly damage the device and the degradation products will catalyse further degradation.

Another reason for pre-lithiation is that high-capacity electrodes irreversibly lose capacity after the initial charge and discharge cycles. This is mainly attributed to the formation of a solid electrolyte interphase (SEI) film. By pre-lithiation of the electrodes the loss of lithium ions to the SEI formation can be mainly compensated. In general, the anode of LIC's is pre-lithiated since the cathode is Li-free and will not take part in lithium insertion/desertion processes.

=== Electrolyte ===
The third part of nearly any energy storage device is the electrolyte. The electrolyte must be able to transport electrons from one electrode to the other but it must not limit the electrochemical species in its reaction rate. For LIC's the electrolyte ideally has a high ionic conductivity such that lithium ions can easily reach the anode. Normally, one would use aqueous electrolyte to achieve this but water will react with the lithium ions so non-aqueous electrolytes are often used. The electrolyte used in a LIC is a lithium-ion salt solution that can be combined with other organic components and is generally identical to that used in lithium-ion batteries.

In general, organic electrolytes are used which have a lower electrical conductivity (10 to 60 mS/cm) than aqueous electrolytes (100 to 1000 mS/cm) but are much more stable. Often cyclic (ethylene carbonate) and linear (dimethyl carbonate) carbonates are added to increase conductivity and these even enhance SEI formation stability — there is a smaller chance that much SEI is formed after the initial cycles. Another category of electrolytes are the inorganic glass and ceramic electrolytes. These features have their applications and have their own advantages and disadvantages compared to organic electrolytes which mainly comes from their porous structure.

A separator prevents direct electrical contact between the anode and the cathode. It must be chemically inert in order to prevent it from reacting with the electrolyte which will lower the capabilities of the LIC. However, the separator should let chemical ions through but not the electrons that are formed since this would create a short circuit.

== Properties ==
Typical properties of an LIC are

- high capacitance compared to a capacitor, because of the large anode, though low capacity compared to a Li-ion cell
- high energy density compared to a capacitor (14 W⋅h/kg reported), though low energy density compared to a Li-ion cell
- high power density
- high reliability
- operating temperatures ranging from −20 °C to 70 °C
- low self-discharge (<5% voltage drop at 25 °C over three months)

== Comparison to other technologies ==
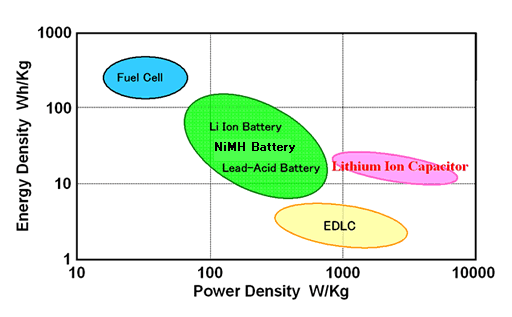
Ragone plot comparing LIC to other technologies

Batteries, EDLC and LICs each have different strengths and weaknesses, making them useful for different categories of applications. Energy storage devices are characterized by three main criteria: power density (in W/kg), energy density (in W⋅h/kg) and cycle life (no. of charge cycles).

LICs have higher power densities than Li-ion cells, and are safer than lithium-ion batteries, in which thermal runaway reactions may occur. Compared to the electric double-layer capacitor (EDLC), the LIC has a higher output voltage. Although they have similar power densities, the LIC has a much higher energy density than other supercapacitors. The Ragone plot in figure 1 shows that LICs combine the high energy of LIBs with the high power density of EDLCs.

The cycle life performance of LICs is much better than Li-ion cells and but is not near that of EDLCs. Some LIC's have a longer cycle life but this is often at the cost of a lower energy density.

In conclusion, the LIC will probably never reach the energy density of a lithium-ion cell and never reach the combined cycle life and power density of a supercapacitor. Therefore, it should be seen as a separate technology with its own uses and applications.

=== LiC and LiB temperature performance ===
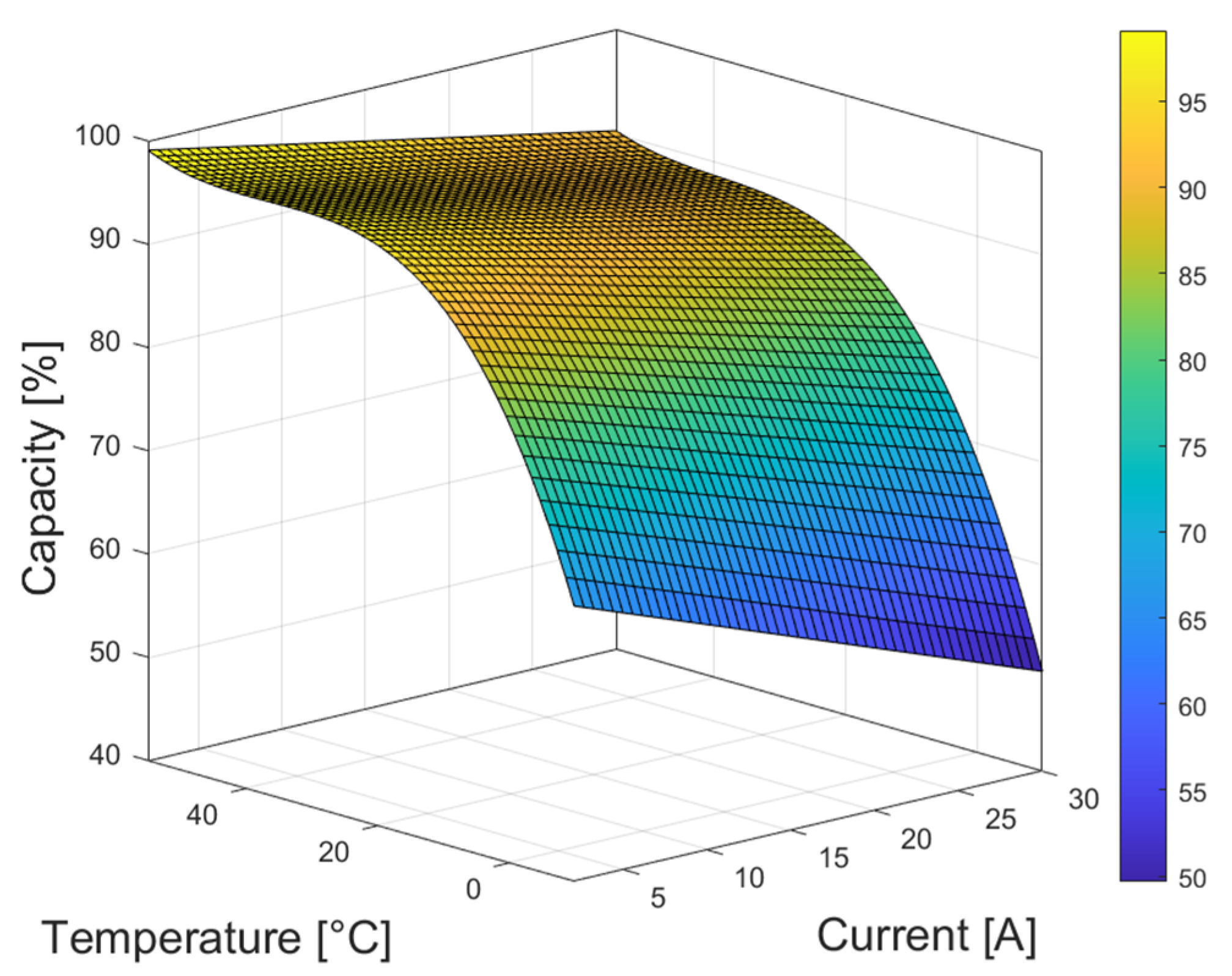
Capacity of LiCs under varying temperatures and discharge C-rates.

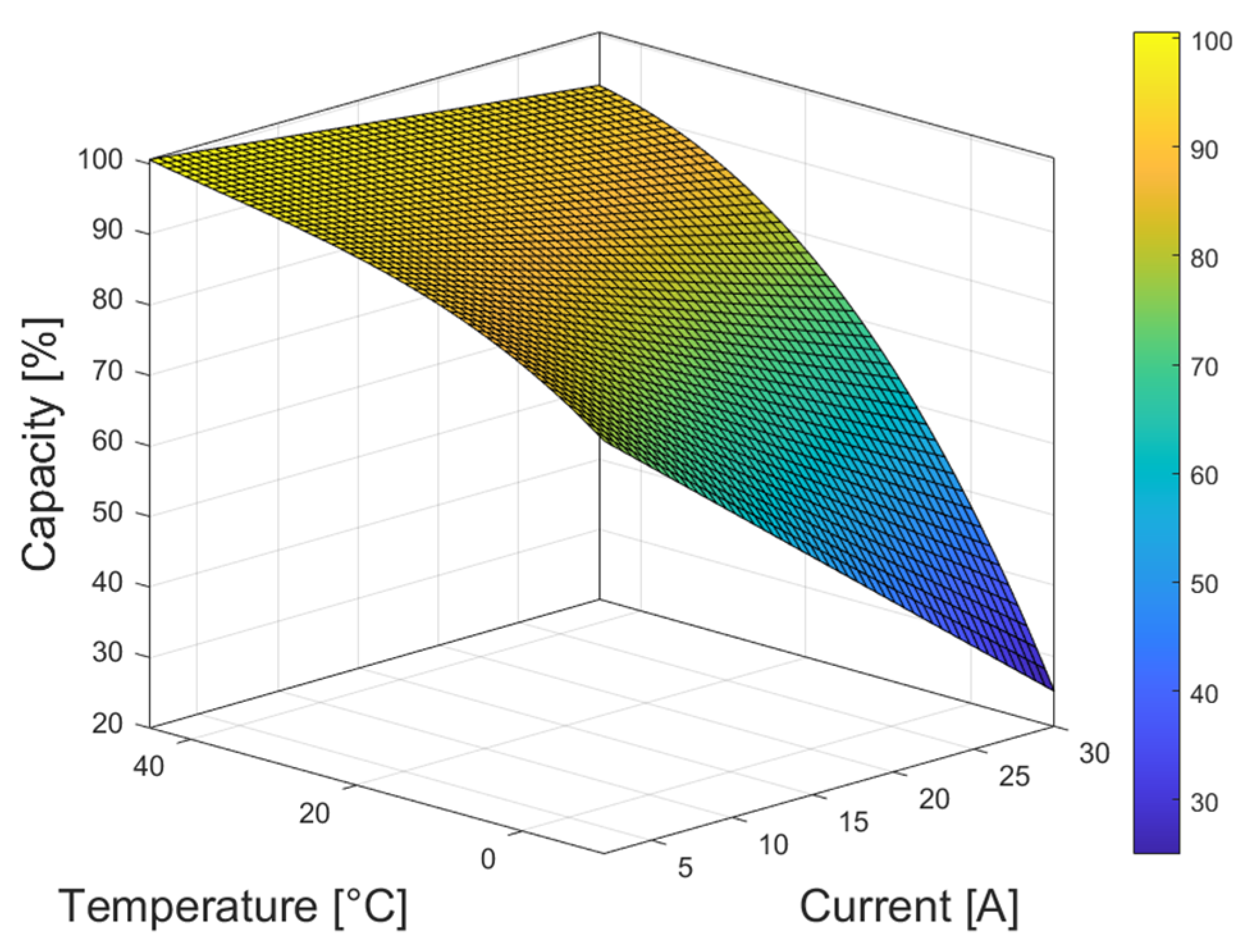
Capacity of LiBs under varying temperatures and discharge C-rates.

Lithium-ion capacitors offer superior performance in cold environments compared to traditional lithium-ion cells. As demonstrated in recent studies, LiCs can maintain approximately 50% of their capacity at temperatures as low as -10 °C under high discharge rates (7.5C). In contrast, lithium-ion cells experience a significant reduction in capacity, dropping to around 50% capacity at just 5 °C under the same conditions. This makes LiCs particularly suitable for applications in cold climates or where the temperature fluctuates widely.

== Applications ==
Lithium-ion capacitors are fairly suitable for applications which require a high energy density, high power densities and excellent durability. Since they combine high energy density with high power density, there is no need for additional electrical storage devices in various kinds of applications, resulting in reduced costs.

Potential applications for lithium-ion capacitors are, for example, in the fields of wind power generation systems, uninterruptible power source systems (UPS), voltage sag compensation, photovoltaic power generation, energy recovery systems in industrial machinery, electric and hybrid vehicles and transportation systems.

One important potential end-use of HIC (hybrid ion capacitor) devices is in regenerative braking. Regenerative braking energy harvesting from trains, heavy automotive, and ultimately light vehicles represents a huge potential market that remains not fully exploited due to the limitations of existing secondary battery and supercapacitor (electrochemical capacitor and ultracapacitor) technologies.
