= Force-sensing capacitor =

Material whose capacitance changes when a force is applied

A force-sensing capacitor is a material whose capacitance changes when a force, pressure or mechanical stress is applied. They are also known as "force-sensitive capacitors". They can provide improved sensitivity and repeatability compared to force-sensitive resistors but traditionally required more complicated electronics.

== Operation principle ==
Typical force-sensitive capacitors are examples of parallel plate capacitors. For small deflections, there is a linear relationship between applied force and change in capacitance, which can be shown as follows:

The capacitance, $C$, equals $\varepsilon A /d$, where $\varepsilon$ is permittivity, $A$ is the area of the sensor and $d$ is the distance between parallel plates. If the material is linearly elastic (so follows Hooks Law), then the displacement, due to an applied force $F$, is $x=F/k$, where $k$ is the spring constant. Combining these equations gives the capacitance after an applied force as:

$C =\varepsilon A /(d_{nominal}-F/k)$, where $d_{nominal}$ is the separation between parallel plates when no force is applied.

This can be rearranged to:

$$C = (\varepsilon Ad_{nominal} +  \varepsilon AF/k)/(d_{nominal}^2-F^2/k^2)$$

Assuming that $d_{nominal}^2 >> F^2/k^2$, which is true for small deformations where $d_{nominal} >> x$, we can simplify this to:

C $\simeq(\varepsilon Ad_{nominal} + \varepsilon AF/k)/(d_{nominal}^2)$

It follows that:

C $\simeq C_{nominal} + \varepsilon AF/kd_{nominal}^2$
C $\simeq C_{nominal} + BF$ where $B = \epsilon A/kd^2$, which is constant for a given sensor.

We can express the change in capacitance $\Delta C$ as:

$$\Delta C = BF$$

== Production ==
SingleTact makes force-sensitive capacitors using moulded silicon between two layers of polyimide to construct a 0.35 mm thick sensor, with force ranges from 1 N to 450 N. The 8mm SingleTact has a nominal capacitance of 75 pF, which increases by 2.2 pF when the rated force is applied. It can be mounted on many surfaces for direct force measurement.

== Uses ==
Force-sensing capacitors can be used to create low-profile force-sensitive buttons. They have been used in medical imaging to map pressures in the esophagus and to image breast and prostate cancer.
