= Dialight =

Dialight plc
- Company type: Public (LSE: DIA)
- Industry: Electronics
- Founded: 1938; 88 years ago
- Headquarters: London, United Kingdom
- Key people: David Blood (Chairman); Fariyal Khanbabi (Chief executive officer)
- Revenue: ▼£151 million (2019)
- Operating income: ▼£(11.3) million (2019)
- Net income: ▼£(16.2) million (2019)
- Divisions: Signals and Illumination; Solid State Light; Optoelectronics
- Website: www.dialight.com

Dialight plc is a British-based electronics business specialising in light-emitting diode lighting for hazardous locations. It is headquartered in London and operates in North America, the United Kingdom, mainland Europe, Australia, Asia and South America. It is listed on the London Stock Exchange and is a constituent of the FTSE SmallCap, and FTSE techMARK Focus indices.

== History ==
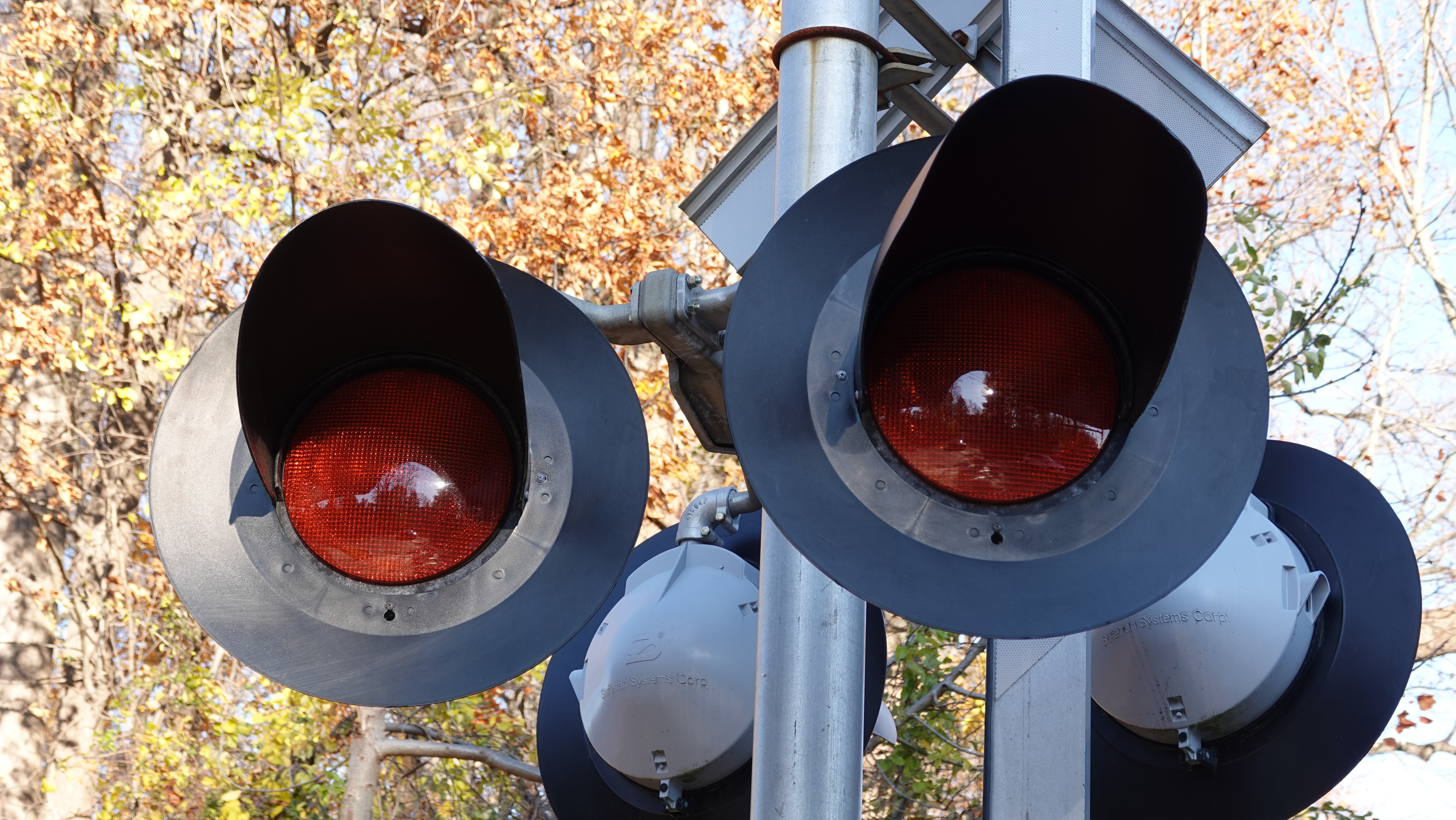
Dialight Low Wattage LED Module shown here mounted on a Railroad Crossing Signal. These LED Modules are commonly used on Traffic Signals and Railroad Crossing Signals across the US.

The business was founded in 1938 and became part of the Dutch company Philips in 1963. In 1990, through a management buyout, it became part of Roxboro Group, which was first listed on the London Stock Exchange in 1993. In 2005, it was renamed Dialight.

In 2012, Dialight announced that they would expand their manufacturing capabilities in Malaysia.

In 2023, it was revealed that Dialight had been involved in prolonged legal proceedings with its former manufacturing partner, Sanmina Corporation, regarding the termination of their manufacturing services agreement. Dialight filed the lawsuit seeking compensation for what it alleged were Sanmina’s fraudulent actions, gross negligence, and breaches of their contract.

In 2024, Dialight's claims of fraudulent inducement against its former contractor were allowed to proceed to trial after a New York court denied Sanmina's attempts to dismiss these allegations.

== Operations ==
The company has three divisions:

- Signals and Illumination (traffic and rail signals as well as obstruction lights)
- Solid state lights (low-energy lighting technology)
- Optoelectronics
