= Interlink Electronics =

Interlink Electronics Inc.
- Industry: Computer hardware
- Founded: April 30, 1984; 42 years ago
- Headquarters: Camarillo, California, United States
- Key people: Steven Bronson (CEO)
- Products: Force sensing, position sensing, mouse, pointing and touchpad
- Website: interlinkelectronics.com

Interlink Electronics, Inc. is a technology company that specializes in manufacturing sensors that are used in electronic portable devices, such as smartphones, GPS systems, and in industrial computers and systems controls.

== History ==
Interlink was founded on April 30, 1996, and released the first force-sensing resistor for commercial use in 1977.

In 2001, Interlink helped Microsoft design the controller for the Xbox.

== Legal ==
Interlink Electronics filed a patent-infringement lawsuit against Nintendo in December 2006 over the pointing functionality of the Wii Remote, claiming "loss of reasonable royalties, reduced sales and/or lost profits as a result of the infringing activities" of Nintendo. The lawsuit was dismissed by Interlink in March 2007.
