= Visual Planet =

English technology company

Visualplanet Ltd
- Type: Ltd
- Founded: 2001
- Fate: Closed, 2017
- Headquarters: Oakington, Cambridgeshire, England
- Key people: Vernon Spencer, MD and Founder; Mike Cole, Co-Owner
- Products: Touch Screen Foils (Visualplanet touchfoils); Thru-window Touch Applications; Interactive Rear Projection Screens; Digital Signage; Corporate Communication Solutions

Visualplanet Ltd specialises in the manufacture and global distribution of projected capacitance interactive touch screen foils, which are designed to be used in a wide variety of Touch Screen applications from through-window touch to direct integration into LCD Screens. From its headquarters in Cambridge, England, the company distributes high quality products to an international network of partners.

== History ==
The original visualplanet logo

The full version visualplanet logo

In 2001, the company was founded after noticing the potential to allow customer access to information after high street closing hours. Main activities included sourcing and developing components and technologies for through window interactive solutions. Dominant activities presently include the manufacture of projected capacitance touchfoils and distribution to an established group of global resellers, integrators, and distributors. In 2006 the company moved headquarters to Cambridge, UK. Between 2006 and 2007 visualplanet's turnover had doubled and the company currently has over 100 partners in major markets around the world who are prominent in the Digital Signage, Audio Visual, and Touch Screen markets. The company's main focus has progressed from a service-oriented company to that of a touch screen technology manufacturer and global distributor.

In 2011 visualplanet rebranded their marketing communications and introduced a new identity within the corporate logos and website.

Visualplanet went into voluntary liquidation in December 2018.

== Products ==
=== Visualplanet touchfoil ===
Visualplanet's Projected Capacitance Interactive Touch Screen Foil known globally as the “touchfoil” can be applied to and work through any non-metallic surface and create a fully functional touch screen. The touchfoils can be built into glass partitions, doors, furniture, external windows, and street signage.

Since 2002 visualplanet have been committed to developing and improving the touchfoil. Producing the world's first 150" film based projective capacitive touch sensor; visualplanet invented the touchfoil permanent and reusable mounting methods to enable long and short-term installations; pioneered the integration of UV blocking, rear-projection and scratch resistant films into the product.

Previous to the rebrand in 2011 the product was known as the ViP Interactive Foil.

==== Projected capacitance ====
Projected capacitance is used to allow interactivity through any non-metallic surface and involves the relationship between a conductive pad and a third object. In touch screen applications, the third object can be a human finger. Capacitance forms between the user's fingers and the wires in the conductive pad. The visualplanet touchfoil is made up of a clear laminated plastic foil with an XY array of sensing wires. These wires are connected to a controller. Once a touch is made, the change in capacitance is detected and the X and Y coordinates are calculated. Sizes of the touchfoil vary from 30 to 167 in (760 to 4,240 mm), maximum sizing dependent on 4:3, 16:9 or 21:9 display formats. The company's customers can choose the position of the electronic components. When applied to glass, the touchfoil can be programmed for different thickness of glass and even be used with gloved hands.

==== Touch functions and gestures ====
Visualplanet's MA9 software provides mouse pointer options for use with the visualplanet touchfoil which is suitable for standard mouse emulation within Windows 7, MacOS and Linux Operating Systems. Pinch and zoom operates when the user touches the interactive screen with two fingers thus utilizing the function of the centre mouse roller for Windows XP, Vista and 7.

In September 2011 visualplanet's multi-touch function was launched offering Windows 7 gesture support and a software development kit.

==== Electronic Control Boards ====
From 2009 onwards the visualplanet touchfoil has been made available with a choice of two electronic control boards. These are Serial and USB. Both controller board versions can be removed from the touchfoil's touch area and secured into position once the touch screen is fully installed.

==== Thru-Window Touch ====
The visualplanet touchfoil can be applied directly to a window or a glass sheet. A rear projection screen or LCD can then be mounted behind the touchfoil to create a through-window/glass touch experience. The touchfoil can be permanently mounted or mounted with the intention of later removal. With the touchfoil being applied one side of the glass, and the user being the other side, the controller and electronics are completely safe from vandalism and weather conditions. The electronics can be programmed for different thicknesses of glass up to 25mm thick.

==== Interactive Projection and LCD Screens ====
The visualplanet touchfoil can be applied to holographic and high contrast diffusion screens to provide large dynamic information displays. To turn any standard LCD from a passive display into an interactive touch screen simply apply the touchfoil on to a glass or acrylic sheet, it can then be used as a Touch screen overlay or integrated directly into a LCD.

== The Gadget Show ==
=== Future Technology ===
On 17 December 2007, the visualplanet touchfoil appeared on British television via 5's, The Gadget Show. The show's presenter, Jon Bentley visited Visualplanet and with his crew, filmed numerous stages of the production process. During the eighth and final episode of series 7, the visualplanet touchfoil featured alongside companies such as Microsoft and BT in the "Future Tech" section showing how R&D departments are contributing to the future technology of gadgets. This particular Winter Special episode also reviewed products such as watches, personal media players, and batteries. This was Visualplanet's first appearance on television.

== Peter Mandelson ==
=== Advanced Manufacturing ===
Peter Mandelson visited visualplanet's Cambridge base on 25 July 2009 launching the advanced manufacturing scheme aimed to offer support to firms trying to make new strides in design, aerospace, electronics and other emerging fields. The launch was mainly aimed at a £150 million nationwide package of measures aimed at helping businesses develop manufacturing skills.

== Awards ==
The company has won a variety of awards including the British Computer Society (BCS), award for its innovative technology. When received in 2006, Visualplanet's ViP Interactive Foil had been sold through a network of 60 added value resellers across the world. In 2003 Visualplanet won awards at the Nabarro Nathanson Technology Industry Awards in two of the eight categories. These were "Most Innovative Project", and "Most Innovative use of Technology in a Project". Further to this, 2003 saw visualplanet claim the "Personalised Information Product Award" at the Information Management Awards for the most exciting and innovative new product that enables the delivery or personalised information in a business or home environment.

== "Because it's a Visual World" ==
"Because it's a Visual World" was the slogan for visualplanet prior to the rebrand in 2011 with reference to the visual solutions that the company and the touchfoils offer, on a global scale. The phrase featured on the company logo, other literature such as letterheads, brochure inserts, and on the company website. There was also reference to visualplanet's connection with partners both on a worldwide basis, and those who address the retail, corporate, entertainment, education, and local authority industries. The technology provides solutions already widely used in shops, offices, libraries, and public spaces worldwide.
