= Sensel =

Electronics company based in California

Sensel Inc.
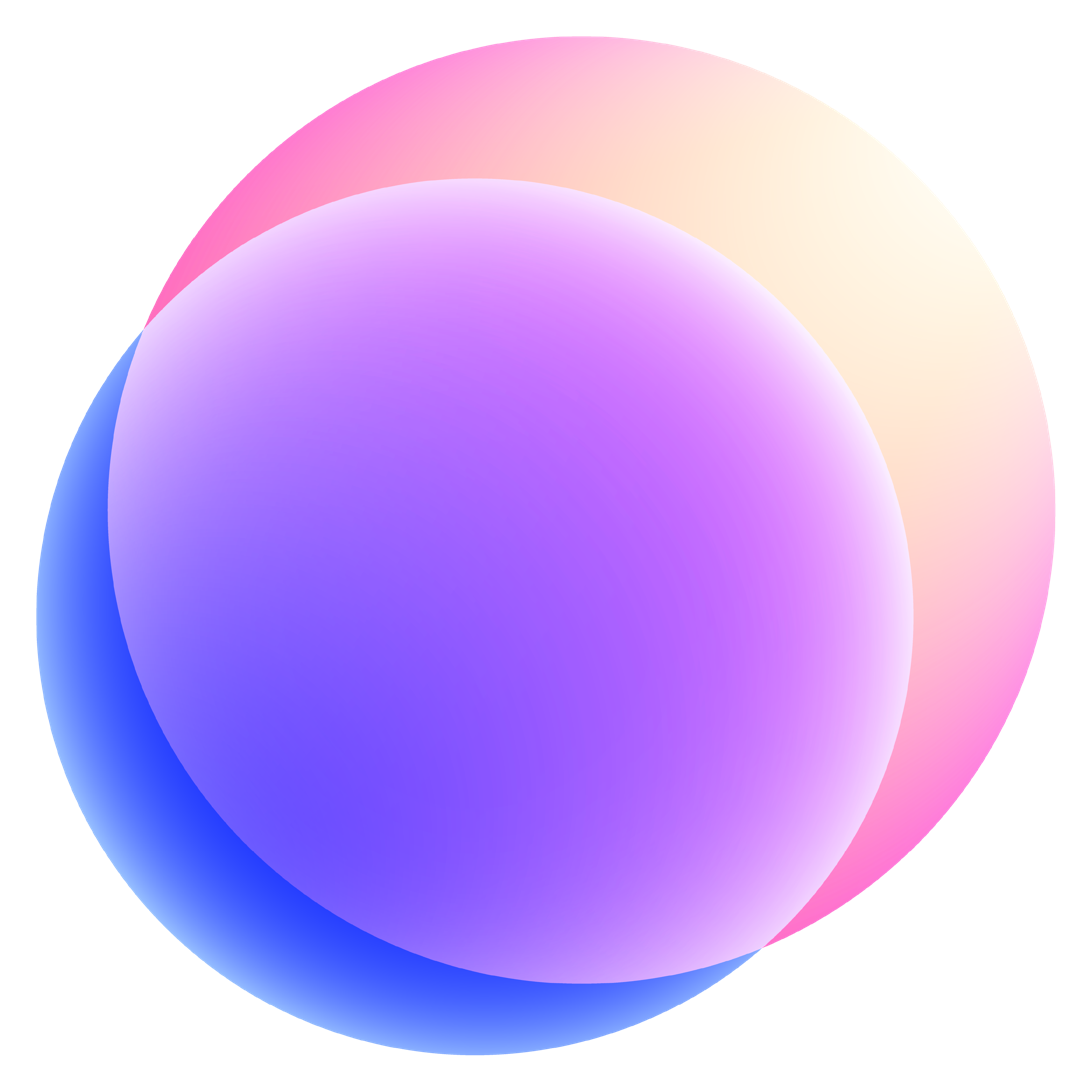
- Type: Private
- Industry: Computer hardware Musical instruments
- Founded: 2013; 13 years ago
- Founders: Ilya Rosenberg; Aaron Zarraga
- Defunct: April 2025; 1 year ago
- Fate: Acquired by Cirque Corporation
- Headquarters: Sunnyvale, California, USA
- Products: Sensel Morph; Touchpads; Haptic technology Tactile sensors Force sensors
- Website: sensel.com

Sensel Inc. was an electronics company based in Sunnyvale, California that builds touch input technologies. It was founded in 2013 by former Amazon engineers Ilya Rosenberg and Aaron Zarraga. Sensel's first product, the Morph, is a pressure sensitive input device for creative applications. In January 2021, it was announced that Sensel's touch technology would be incorporated in the touchpad for Lenovo's ThinkPad X1 Titanium Yoga laptop. Sensel was acquired by Cirque Corporation in 2025.

== History ==
Sensel co-founder and CEO Ilya Rosenberg met co-founder and CTO Aaron Zarraga while working at Amazon's Lab126. After leaving Amazon, the two founded Sensel in 2013.

Together, the pair invented a new type of force sensor that could be manufactured like a printed circuit board. Sensel used Kickstarter in 2015 to bring its first product, The Morph, to market. The campaign raised $442,648. The Morph began shipping to its Kickstarter backers in 2017, and became available for direct purchase later that year.

In 2019, Sensel began shipping its first new Morph Overlay since its Kickstarter campaign, the Buchla Thunder Overlay, which was created in partnership with synthesizer and MIDI controller manufacturer Buchla U.S.A.

In 2021, Sensel announced its new touchpad demonstration kit with touch, force, and haptic technologies. It was also announced that Sensel's touch technology would be included in the touchpad for Lenovo's ThinkPad X1 Titanium Yoga laptop.

In May 2022, Sensel announced that it has discontinued the Morph and would not bring it back into production. The possibility of some new product at some future unspecified time was suggested. Sensel and its intellectual property were acquired by Cirque Corporation in April 2025.
