= Rick Bergman =

American businessman

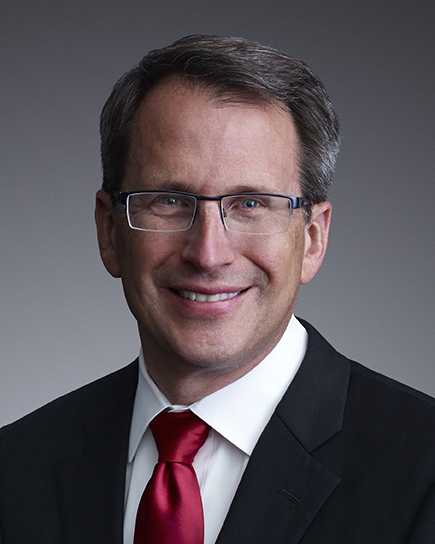
- Rick Bergman
- Born: 1964 or 1965 (age 61–62)
- Education: University of Michigan; University of Colorado Boulder
- Occupation: Business executive

Rick Bergman (born 1964) was the president and CEO of Synaptics from 2011 to March 2019. He joined Synaptics in September 2011 from Advanced Micro Devices, Inc. (AMD), where he served as senior vice president and general manager of AMD's Product Group. He had been a longtime executive in the graphics chip business, serving in many positions at ATI Technologies before it was acquired in 2006 by AMD.

In May 2015, he was appointed to Maxwell Technologies board of directors.

== Education and personal life ==
Bergman holds a Bachelor of Science degree in electrical engineering from the University of Michigan and a master of business administration from the Leeds School of Business at the University of Colorado Boulder. He is an avid runner and has climbed Mount Kilimanjaro. He currently lives in San Jose and has 3 daughters.

== Career ==
Bergman began his career at IBM, and later worked in management roles at Texas Instruments, Inc. and Exponential Inc. He was chief operating officer at S3 Graphics until January 2001. He then served in many positions at ATI Technologies before it was acquired in 2006 by AMD. AnandTech wrote that Bergman was "instrumental in helping stage ATI's comeback as a player in the GPU space".

At AMD, he was senior vice president and general manager of the Products Group. Bergman was responsible for delivering microprocessors and graphics chips to AMD's customers and for Fusion, which are the combination chips that put a graphics chip and processor on a single piece of silicon.

In September 2011, Bergman departed AMD to become President and CEO of Synaptics. He became a Director of Maxwell Technologies in 2015. He has been interviewed by media outlets including CNBC and Venture Beat on his firm and the evolving nature of interactions between humans and electronic devices. In 2017, the acquisition of Conexant and multimedia division of Marvell enters Synaptics into the IoT space that Bergman is calling Synaptics 3.0.

In 2019 Bergman rejoined AMD as the leader of Compute and Graphics business unit. In April 2023, he announced he would be retiring.
