= Synaptics =

American computer-to-human interface company

Synaptics, Inc.
- Type: Public
- Traded as: Nasdaq: SYNA; S&P 400 component
- Industry: Computer hardware and software
- Founded: 1986; 40 years ago, in California, U.S.
- Founders: Federico Faggin; Carver Mead
- Headquarters: San Jose, California, U.S.
- Key people: Nelson Chan (chairman); Rahul Patel (CEO)
- Products: TouchPads; ClearPad touch controllers; Natural ID and Clear ID fingerprint sensors; ClearView display drivers; TouchView TDDI; AudioSmart DSPs and SOCs; VideoSmart processors; ImagingSmart processors
- Revenue: ▲US$1.07 billion (2025)
- Operating income: ▲US$−94 million (2025)
- Net income: ▼US$−48 million (2025)
- Total assets: ▼US$2.58 billion (2025)
- Total equity: ▼US$1.39 billion (2025)
- Number of employees: 1,700 (2025)
- Website: synaptics.com
- Footnotes; Financials as of June 28, 2025.

Synaptics, Inc. is an American technologies and computer-to-human interface devices development company based in San Jose, California. It develops touchpads and fingerprint biometrics technology for computer laptops; touch, display driver, and fingerprint biometrics technology for smartphones; and touch, video and far-field voice, low-power AI processors, and wireless technology for smart home devices, wearables, and automobiles. Synaptics sells its products to original equipment manufacturers (OEMs) and display manufacturers.

Examples of technologies developed by the company include computer touchpads, the click wheel on the classic iPod, touch sensors for Android phones, touch and display driver integrated chips (TDDI), and fingerprint sensors. These designs are used in devices such as PCs, wearables, drones, gaming systems, media systems, cars, industrial security and monitoring equipment, and virtual reality headsets.

== History ==
=== 1986–1998: Early history ===
Federico Faggin and Carver Mead founded Synaptics in 1986. They used their research on neural networks and transistors on chips to build pattern recognition products such as the "Silicon Retina", a circuit board emulating the human retina's visual processing. In 1991, Synaptics patented a refined "winner take all" circuit for teaching neural networks how to recognize patterns and images. The circuit uses basic physics principles in order to select the strongest signal from the different processors.

In 1992, the company used the pattern recognition techniques it developed to build the world's first touchpad for laptop computers that allowed users to control the cursor and click with no additional mechanical buttons. The pad was a replacement for trackballs and mice used at the time. By 1994, Twinhead and Epson America had adopted Synaptics' touchpad for their computers (Epson with the ActionNote), followed by Apple in 1995 and later by other computer manufacturers, including Compaq and Dell.

=== 1999–2010: Initial public offering and growth ===
In 1999, Francis Lee took over as CEO. A year later, in 2000, Synaptics started selling touch technology for digital media players.

In 2002, Synaptics had an initial public offering. As adoption of the touchpad grew, Synaptics sought to integrate the technology with other products. In 2004, Apple debuted the iPod Mini and fourth-generation iPod, both featuring a scrolling click wheel that used Synaptics' capacitive touch technology. Synaptics also provided a similar but vertical click wheel for the Creative Zen Touch portable media player.

In 2005, Synaptics sensors were featured in the Samsung B310, the first mobile phone to use capacitive-touch technology. In October 2006, Synaptics provided a live demonstration of the Onyx, a concept smartphone with a color touchscreen enabled by its ClearPad touch controller technology. The Onyx's touch sensor could tell the difference between a finger and a cheek, preventing accidental inputs during calls. The company's touch technology was used in LG's Prada phone in 2007, which was the world's first mobile phone with a capacitive touchscreen.

In 2008, touch sensors developed by Synaptics were used in T-Mobile's G1 phone, one of the first Android phones. In the same year, Federico Faggin retired from the board of directors of Synaptics. In 2009, Synaptics announced the development of the Fuse concept smartphone. It had touch sensitivity on the back of the phone, the ability to interact with the phone by squeezing, animated icons, a user interface sensitive to the phone's orientation and tilt, and haptic gestures.

=== 2011–2019: Expansion, acquisitions, and further growth ===
In 2011, Synaptics appointed Rick Bergman to succeed Francis Lee as CEO. In 2012, Synaptics introduced the first pressure recognizing touchscreen, which allowed multi-finger and variable-force input. In 2013, Synaptics acquired Validity Sensors, a fingerprint sensor vendor, adding fingerprint sensing technology to the company. In the same year, Synaptics relocated its headquarters to San Jose from Santa Clara. Six months after the move, Synaptics expanded its campus, purchasing nearby property for $10 million. Synaptics is a founding member of the FIDO (Fast ID Online) Alliance and the Universal Stylus Initiative (USI).

In 2014, Synaptics acquired Renesas SP Drivers Inc., a Japanese company specializing in chips that manage LCD displays. The acquisition enabled Synaptics to combine touch and display driver technologies into a single "TDDI" (Touch and Display Driver Integration) chip. In 2015, Synaptics expanded into additional markets, including automotive, wearables and PC peripherals. In July 2015, Synaptics announced a unique “match-in-sensor” fingerprint authenticator for laptops and other devices that authenticates the fingerprint within the chip.

In 2016, Synaptics introduced its first optical-based fingerprint sensor, which would allow the sensor to be placed under smartphones' glass displays rather than under a separate button. After improving the technology, the company sent it into full production a year later. In 2017, Synaptics acquired Conexant Systems, an Amazon Alexa partner that creates voice and audio software and silicon products for smart homes. At the same time, Synaptics acquired Marvell Technology Group's Multimedia Solutions unit, which creates video and audio processing technology. The two acquisitions were intended to aid Synaptics' expansion into the Internet of things (IoT) market.

In 2018, the Chinese company Vivo announced a smartphone featuring Synaptics' optical fingerprint sensor. This was the world’s first full-production smartphone with fingerprint authentication directly in the OLED display. In 2019, the board of directors appointed Michael Hurlston as the new CEO. Under Hurlston's leadership the company focused on growing its IoT business, expanding from its focus on sensors on glass towards development of low-power sensors to IoT devices.

=== 2020–present: Acquisitions, investments in IoT and AI technology ===
In July 2020, Synaptics acquired DisplayLink, the developer of software and semiconductors that connect visual devices to computers. Also, in July 2020, Synaptics acquired Broadcom's wireless IoT business assets and manufacturing rights. In December 2020, Synaptics and Eta Compute established a co-development partnership, with Synaptics investing in Eta's Series C funding. The partnership allows Synaptics to use Eta's Tensai Flow software, including its AI applications and neural network tools, while Eta gains access to Synaptics' ultra-low-power Katana Edge AI SoC.

In December 2021, Synaptics acquired DSP Group for $538 million, integrating voice and vision artificial intelligence (AI) capabilities into its portfolio and strengthening its wireless offerings with ultra-low-energy (ULE) enabled security applications. In February 2022, Synaptics sold its headquarters and North San Jose campus for $58 million. In October 2022, Synaptics acquired Emza Visual Sense, an Israel-based company specializing in ultra-low-power AI for visual sensing. In 2024, Synaptics introduced a platform based on its neural network processing technology for developers of Edge AI products. It provides hardware and software resources intended to support the creation of custom applications. In June 2026, onsemi agreed to acquire Synaptics for $7 billion.

In October 2026, Synaptics issued a cease-and-desist to the Vino project, an open source implementation of the DisplayLink protocol, causing its source code to be removed from GitHub.

== Technology ==
Synaptics was founded to develop chips that utilize neural networks to mimic human brain functions. In 1989, Synaptics received a patent for neural network-related circuitry designed to associate new events with previously learned ones.

In 1991, Synaptics researchers patented an enhancement of the "winner-take-all" circuit, originally developed by John Lazzaro at the University of Colorado. The circuit functions as a selector within a network of processors or neurons, identifying and amplifying the strongest signal based on fundamental physics principles. The patent introduced a method for dynamic recalibration of neurons, where the system self-tests against a reference pattern, adjusting biases by strengthening weaker signals and reducing overly sensitive ones. This allows for nearly instantaneous recalibrations, enabling continuous accuracy adjustments.

Synaptics also holds over 2000 patents for human technologies. Many Synaptics products are based on capacitive sensing technology, sensing the electrical properties of the finger(s) touching the sensor, as opposed to a resistive touchscreen . Synaptics also has optical sensing technology.

== Products and services ==
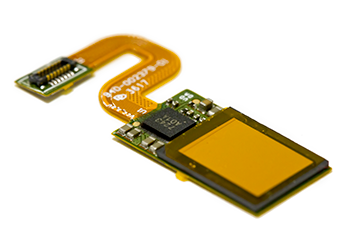
Synaptics Clear ID fingerprint sensor

Synaptics originally focused on developing touch technology products and later expanded into IoT technology. In 1992, Synaptics introduced a chip designed to read magnetic characters on checks, notable for its higher accuracy and speed in handling poorly printed text compared to conventional technologies. The chip produced by Synaptics I-1000 was used in the Gemstone Onyx check reader of Verifone.

Synaptics continues to develop laptop computer touchpads and fingerprint biometric technology, and other types of touch sensors and display drivers. It has also developed sensors for multiple parameters, including temperature, magnetic, capacitive, and inductive sensors that can be integrated into devices such as video game controllers, wearable devices such as earbuds. In 2016, Synaptics developed the FS9100, a fingerprint sensor that can function accurately beneath up to one millimeter of glass, making it easier to integrate under a device's display.

In the automotive industry, Synaptics has developed technology that enables drivers to adjust heating controls on touch screens while wearing thick gloves in freezing temperatures. In September 2018, the company began testing fingerprint technology in cars. This biometric system allows vehicle owners to personalize settings such as music preferences, seat adjustments, navigation options, and temperature settings based on fingerprint recognition. It also enables parents to implement geofencing limits to control where and how far teenage drivers can travel.

Its connectivity products include wireless connectivity, such as Wi-Fi and Bluetooth products, and technology such as its wireless device communications protocol, Matter, which enables devices to operate together regardless of their different wireless interfaces. Synaptics acquired DisplayLink in 2020, adding that company's hardware technology for docking stations and video conferencing, and software for graphics connectivity to its products. It also develops wired connection products such as converters for USB Type-C to HDMI or DisplayPort, for high resolution video display.

Synaptics is also the developer of IronVeil, a technology that allows peripheral manufacturers to incorporate fingerprint recognition into devices such as mice, keyboards, and other peripherals compatible with Windows 10. IronVeil is a small embedded sensor measuring 0.15 by 0.39 inches, designed to authenticate users within 180 milliseconds.

Synaptics develops a variety of types of chips, including low-power edge AI processors and system-on-chip (SoC) technology for devices, such as smart home wireless devices, headsets, and for graphics connectivity for video displays. It develops and markets sound processing chips for voice recognition, used in voice controlled devices, including far-field voice DSPs. In addition to its processors, it also develops display driver IC chips for technology such as VR headsets.

As of 2024, Synaptics develops and markets products for connectivity, sensing, and processing, as well as touch and display drivers, focused on the IoT market. In addition to developing developing enterprise workspace technology such as docking stations. Synaptics' technology is used in devices including PCs, wearables, drones, gaming systems, media systems, cars, industrial security and monitoring equipment, and virtual reality headsets.

== Leadership ==
=== List of chief executive officers ===
- Federico Faggin (1986–1998)
- Francis Lee (1998–2011)
- Rick Bergman (2011–2019)
- Michael Hurlston (August 2019–Feb 2025)
- Ken Rizvi (Interim CEO) (February 2025 - May 2025)
- Rahul Patel (June 2025–present)

== See also ==
- Alps Electric
- ELAN Microelectronics
