= Cirque Corporation =

- Logo used since 2019
- Industry: Touchpad, Touchscreen, Secure touchscreen
- Genre: Capacitive Touch Solutions
- Headquarters: Salt Lake City, Utah, USA
- Area served: Worldwide
- Products: GlidePoint, GlideTouch, GlidePath
- Owner: Alps Electric
- Website: www.cirque.com

Cirque Corporation is an American subsidiary of the Japanese company Alps Alpine, which developed and commercialized the first successful capacitive touchpad, now widely used in notebook computers. Cirque develops and sells a variety of touch input products, both in original equipment manufacturer and end-user retail form. Cirque was founded in 1991 by George E. Gerpheide, PhD, and James L. O'Callaghan, to commercialize the GlidePoint technology invented in the 1980s by Gerpheide.

== History ==
Logo used from c. 1991 to 2019

For many years, Gerpheide and O'Callaghan traveled in an attempt to convince makers of notebook computer to agree to use GlidePoint. Gerpheide recalls "We would often drive to the COMDEX trade show in Las Vegas and stay in a seedy hotel. There wasn't money for a booth at the show, so we carried our GlidePoint prototypes around the convention center making demonstrations to whoever was willing to watch. The early prototypes had a suitcase full of electronic circuits. I knew they could be shrunk into an integrated circuit, but we didn't have money for that either. So we were seeking a large leap of faith for a manufacturer to agree to use the technology. It was even worse because at that time most notebook computers were running DOS, which did not need a pointing device!"

In April 1994, Cirque adapted GlidePoint into an integrated circuit and began selling a retail GlidePoint touchpad. The first notebook computer containing GlidePoint appeared soon thereafter. GlidePoint technology was licensed to Alps Electric Co., Ltd., and Alps launched touchpad products into the market.

In 2003, Cirque was acquired by Alps Electric as a wholly owned subsidiary. Cirque continues to function as an independent research and technology development facility.

== Technology ==
GlidePoint
GlidePoint was the first touchpad technology to be adopted in notebook computers as a system pointing device, that is, performing the same function as a mouse. Before that, system pointing was performed mostly using a small trackball embedded in the notebook computer case, and other mechanical devices. After GlidePoint's commercial introduction in April 1994, its popularity in notebook computers steadily increased and Synaptics and Logitech also introduced capacitive touchpad technologies. As of 2009, both Synaptics and GlidePoint touchpads are used widely, with approximately 90% of notebook computers using touchpads.

GlidePoint was not the first touch input technology. For example, it was pre-dated by resistive membrane input pads such as used in the Model 3155 Keyboard from Keytronic. Transparent resistive membrane technology is used in personal digital assistants such as the PalmPilot, point of sale terminals, video poker machines, and information kiosks and other touch screens. There are also prior capacitive touch input pads in the patent literature. One, "The UnMouse" was invented by James Logan and marketed by his company Microtouch Systems, Inc. as a retail plug-in mouse alternative product in the 1980s, but discontinued after a few years.

GlidePoint technology senses the presence and absolute position of a finger on the pad's surface using capacitive techniques. Because of the capacitive technique, it does not require electrical contact with the finger, nor does it require the finger to exert pressure on the pad. It measures very small capacitance changes, due to a finger's proximity, among electrodes in a grid buried beneath the insulating surface of the pad. From these measurements, it can determine if a finger is touching the pad, and if so, the finger's absolute position horizontally and vertically on the surface. Subtraction of a preceding absolute position from the present absolute position yields the relative motion of the finger during that time. This relative motion is the same as a mouse for controlling the position of a computer screen cursor.

GlideSensor
Cirque GlideSensor solutions are an extension of GlidePoint capacitive touch technology. They are configured to allow the rapid design of non-conventional touch input products. GlideSensor touch arrays may now be designed to take the form of thin films, flexible surfaces and irregular shapes.

GlideSensor's mixed-mode ASIC controller was designed to blend the performance of GlidePoint with a low-voltage, low-power EEPROM programmable processor. The result is a touch controller capable of being rapidly configured to solve the most unusual input application.

Key GlideSensor technology features at a glance include:

- Design sensors in circular, linear, flexible shapes
- Programmable controller for custom solutions
- Interfaced by SPI, I2C or PS2 for easy integration to microprocessor and PC-based systems
- Efficient low-power management
- Can sense through plastic materials of many colors
- Ideal for handheld portable battery-operated products

== Products ==
Cirque's Circle Trackpad Development Kit is Arduino based and uses open sourced code on GitHub. VR Grip™ is a technology platform that was featured at CES 2018.

== Awards ==
- "Best Products of 1994." PC Magazine. 10 January 1995, GlidePoint Touchpad, recognized as one of six best products on the cover.
- The company was twice recognized as one of the 500 fastest growing private company in America, "The 1997 Ranking of the Fastest-Growing Private Companies in America." Inc. Magazine v. 15 no. 19 p. 149.
