= Alps Alpine =

Japanese multinational corporation

Alps Alpine Co., Ltd.

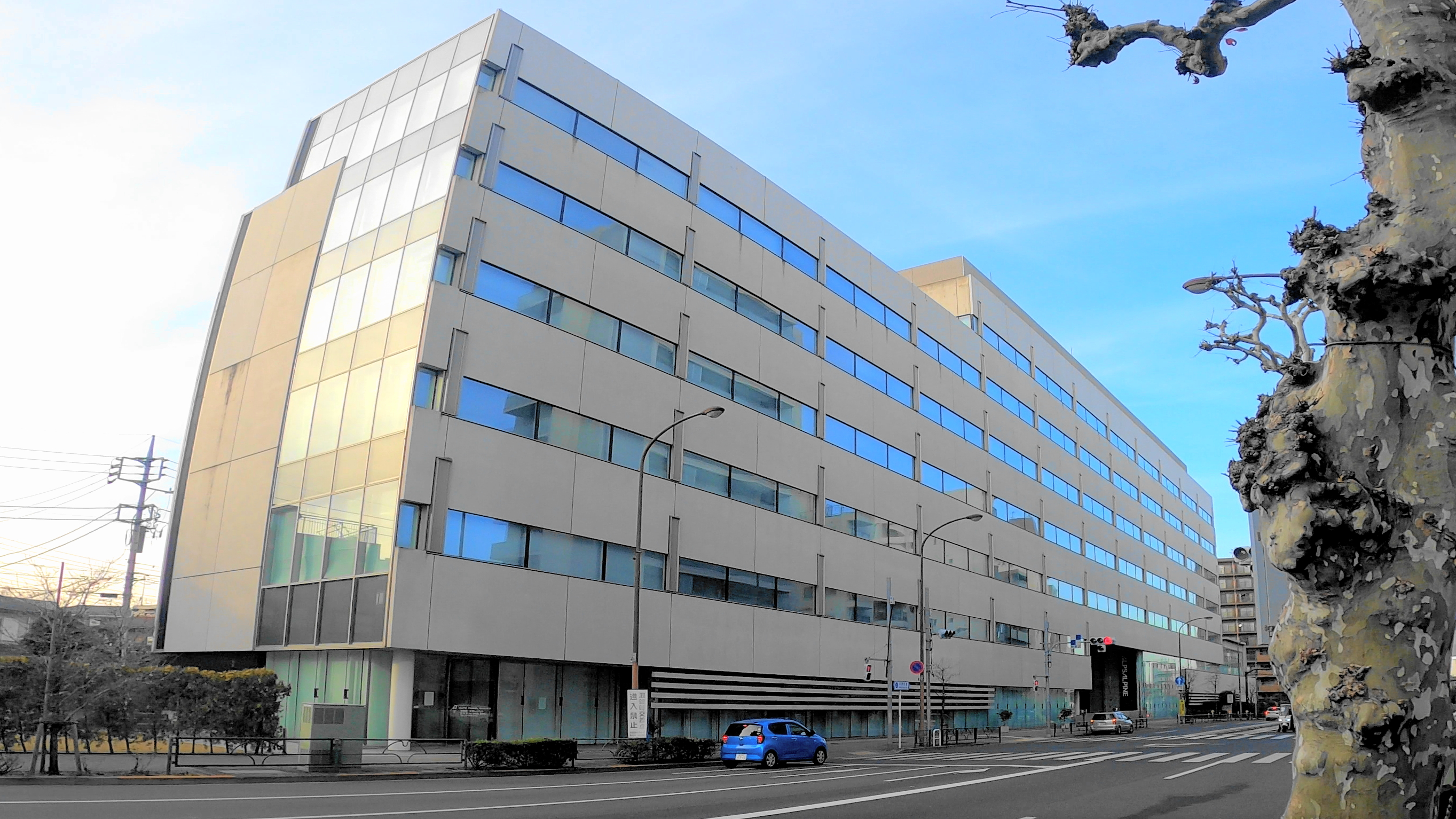
- Headquarters in Ota, Tokyo
- Native name: アルプスアルパイン株式会社
- Romanized name: Arupusu Arupain kabushiki-gaisha
- Formerly: Kataoka Electric Co., Ltd. (1946–1964); Alps Electric Co., Ltd. (1964–2019)
- Type: Public (K.K)
- Traded as: TYO: 6770; Nikkei 225 Component
- Industry: Electronics
- Founded: 1 November 1948; 78 years ago (as Kataoka Electric Co., Ltd.)
- Headquarters: 1-7 Yukigaya-otsuka-machi, Ota, Tokyo, Japan
- Key people: Toshihiro Kuriyama, (president); Masataka Kataoka, (chairman)
- Products: Electronic components; Automotive infotainment systems; Logistic services
- Revenue: US$5.806 billion (FY 2012) (¥ 546.423 billion) (FY 2012)
- Net income: US$75.18 million (FY 2012) (¥ -7.075 billion) (FY 2012)
- Number of employees: 36,199 (as of the end of March 2013)
- Subsidiaries: Alpine Electronics; Cirque Corporation; Alps Logistics; Alps Green Devices
- Website: www.alpsalpine.com/j/

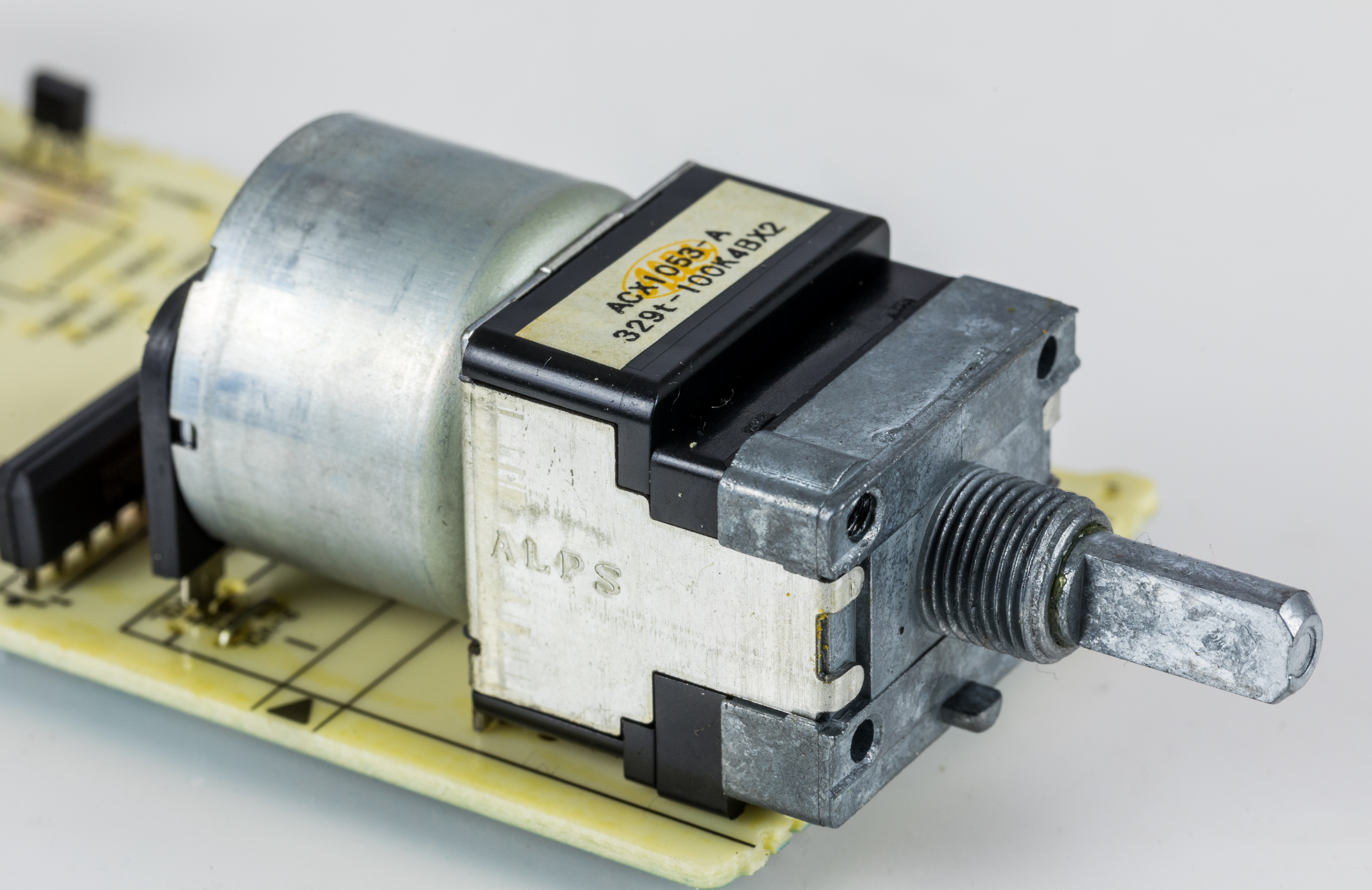
A motorized potentiometer from Alps Electric used in a music center

Logo used from 1964 to 2020

Alps Alpine Co., Ltd (Japanese: アルプスアルパイン株式会社, Hepburn: Arupusu Arupain kabushiki-gaisha), previously known as Alps Electric Co., Ltd. (Japanese: アルプス電気株式会社, Hepburn: Arupusu Denki Kabushiki-gaisha) is a Japanese multinational corporation, headquartered in Tokyo, Japan, producing electronic devices, including switches, potentiometers, sensors, encoders and touchpads.

The company was established in 1948 as Kataoka Electric Co., Ltd. and changed its name to Alps Electric Co., Ltd. in December 1964. Since June 22, 2012, the President has been Toshihiro Kuriyama and Chairman is Masataka Kataoka. Alps is also well known for the Alpine brand of car audio.

The Alps Electric Group has R&D, production and sales bases located in Japan and around the globe—in the Americas, Europe, Southeast Asia, Korea, and Greater China. Since its founding, Alps Electric has supplied around 40,000 types of electronic components to over 2,000 manufacturers of home appliances, mobile devices, automobiles and industrial equipment worldwide.

In 2014, Alps Group comprised 84 subsidiary companies, 25 through Alps Electric, 32 through Alpine Electronics and 27 through Alps Logistics.

The company is listed on the Tokyo Stock Exchange and a constituent of the Nikkei 225 stock index.

After integrating its business with its previous subsidiary Alpine Electronics in January 2019, the company was renamed Alps Alpine Co., Ltd. Alpine had originally been established as a joint venture with Motorola in 1967, but had been a wholly owned subsidiary of Alps since 1978.

== Business divisions ==
Alps Automotive division focuses on provision of custom products and modules, including control panels and steering modules, for specific vehicle models, and components compatible with any vehicle.

Alps Home and Mobile divisions focuses on provision of switches, potentiometers, sensors, and other components through to multi-input devices like touch panels and GlidePoint™ to home, mobile and PC markets. Alps Electric focuses on human-machine and machine-machine interfaces for home appliances, mobile devices and PCs.

Alps Industry, Healthcare & Energy divisions focuses on provision of a wide variety of products, including sensors, power inductors, switches and communication modules, to industry, healthcare and energy markets.

Alps touchpad hardware is developed and manufactured by the Cirque Corporation, which they acquired in 2003; however, the parent company continues to write their own drivers. Their drivers are Windows certified. They are mostly found in Sony, Toshiba and Dell notebooks, as well as the OLPC XO-1. They are considered a major Japanese supplier to Apple, having manufactured keyboards for computers including the original Macintosh and the first iMac.

== Business integration and name change ==
On January 1, 2019, Alps Electric Co., Ltd. and Alpine Electronics, Inc. integrated the two businesses together under the new name of Alps Alpine Co., Ltd.. Alpine Electronics, Inc. became a wholly owned subsidiary of Alps in 1978 when Alps acquired all shares of Alps Motorola Inc.

== Gallery ==
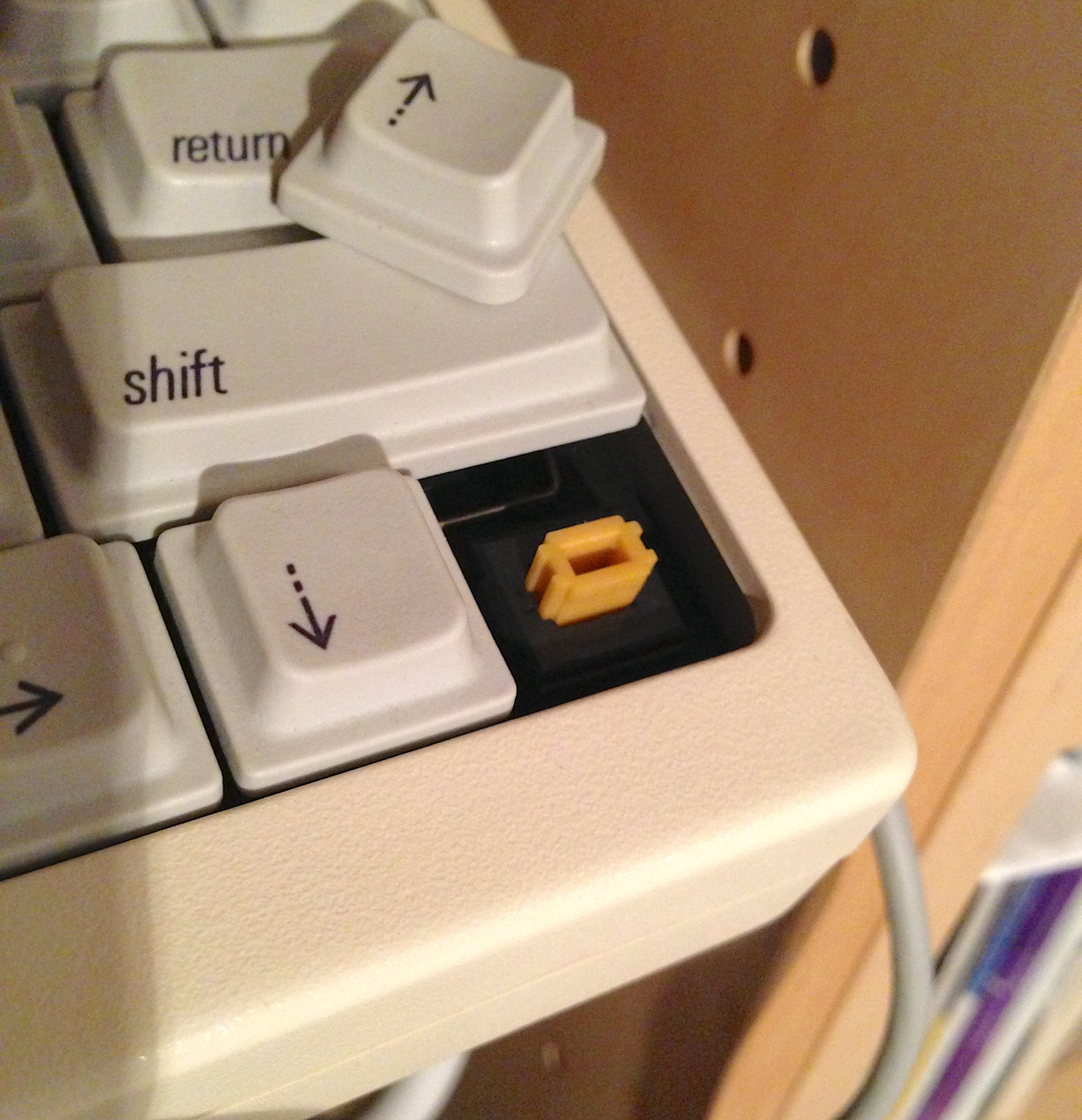
Alps Amber switch in an Apple IIc keyboard

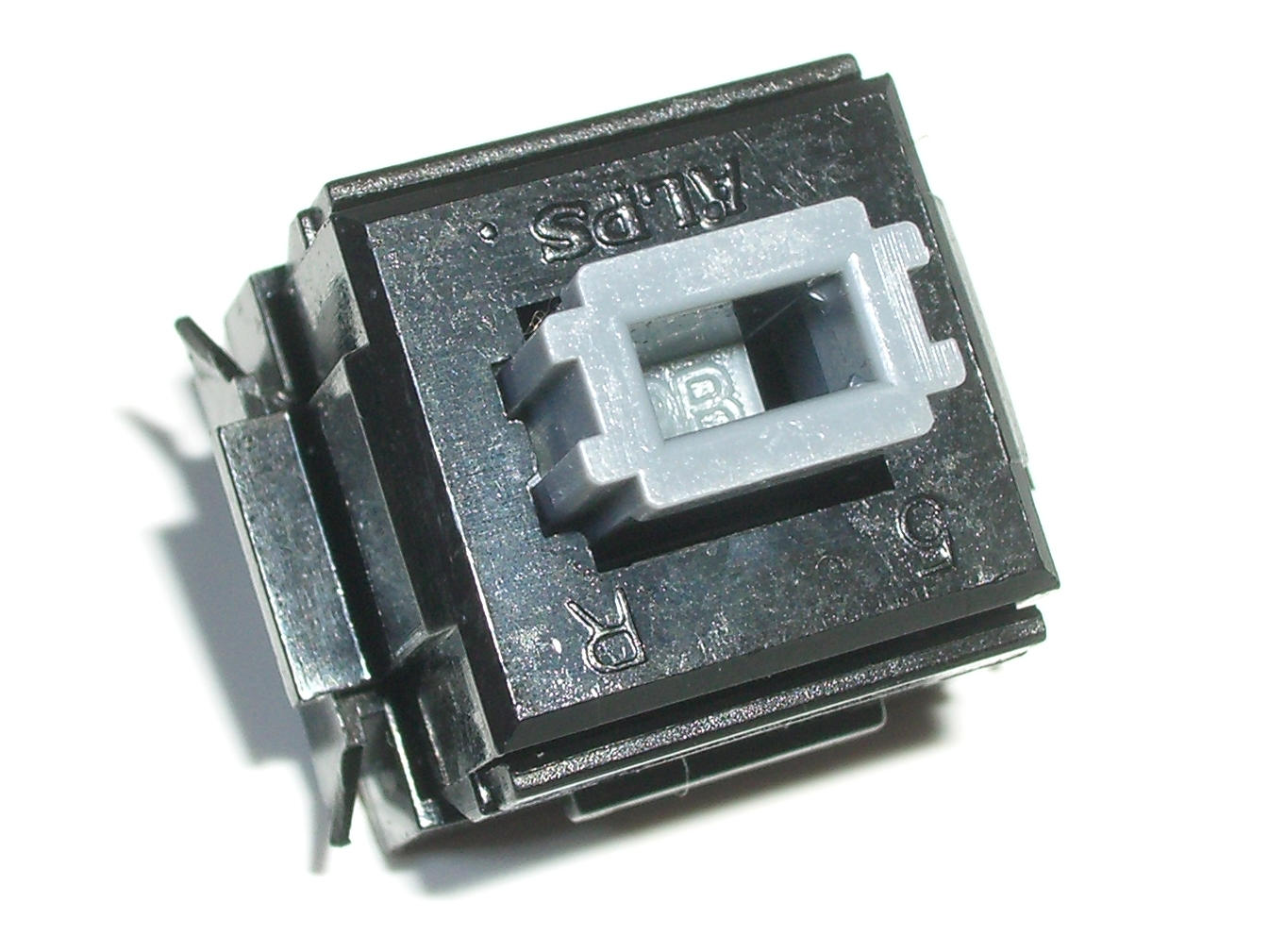
Alps SKBM Grey switch

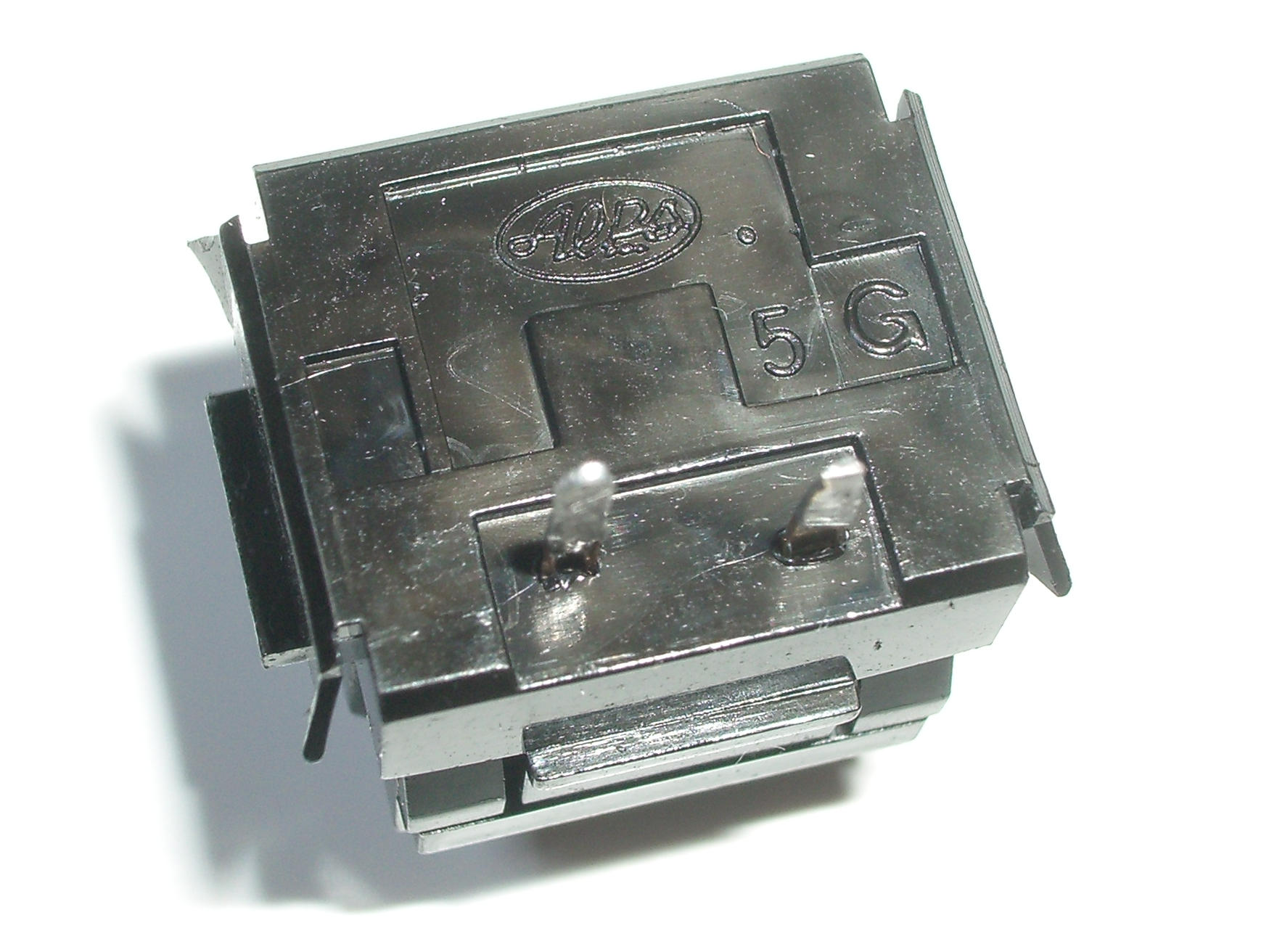
Alps SKBM Grey switch backside with old logo

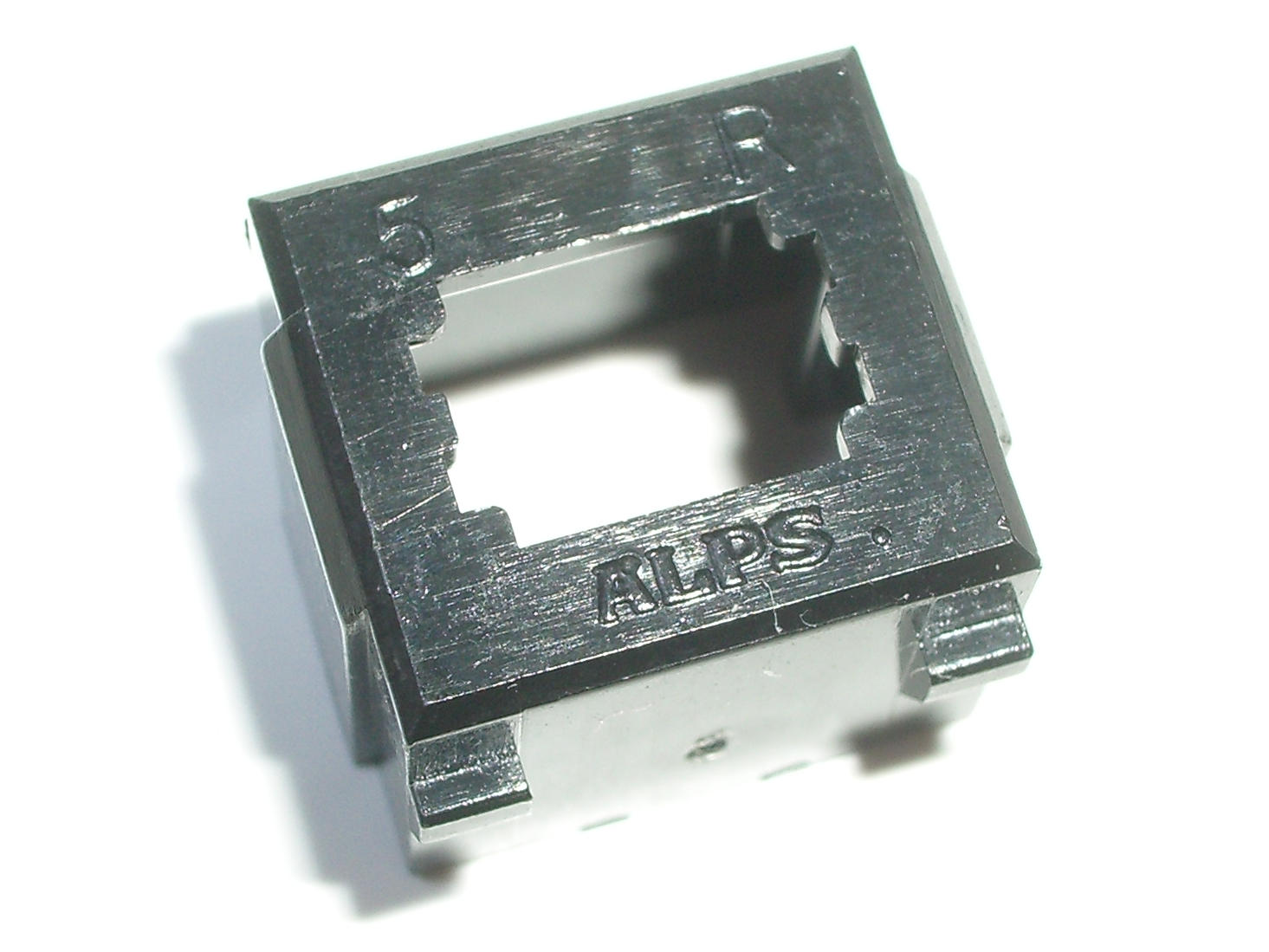
Alps SKBM Grey – upper shell with simplified mould numbering and more rounded, more heavily embossed Alps logo

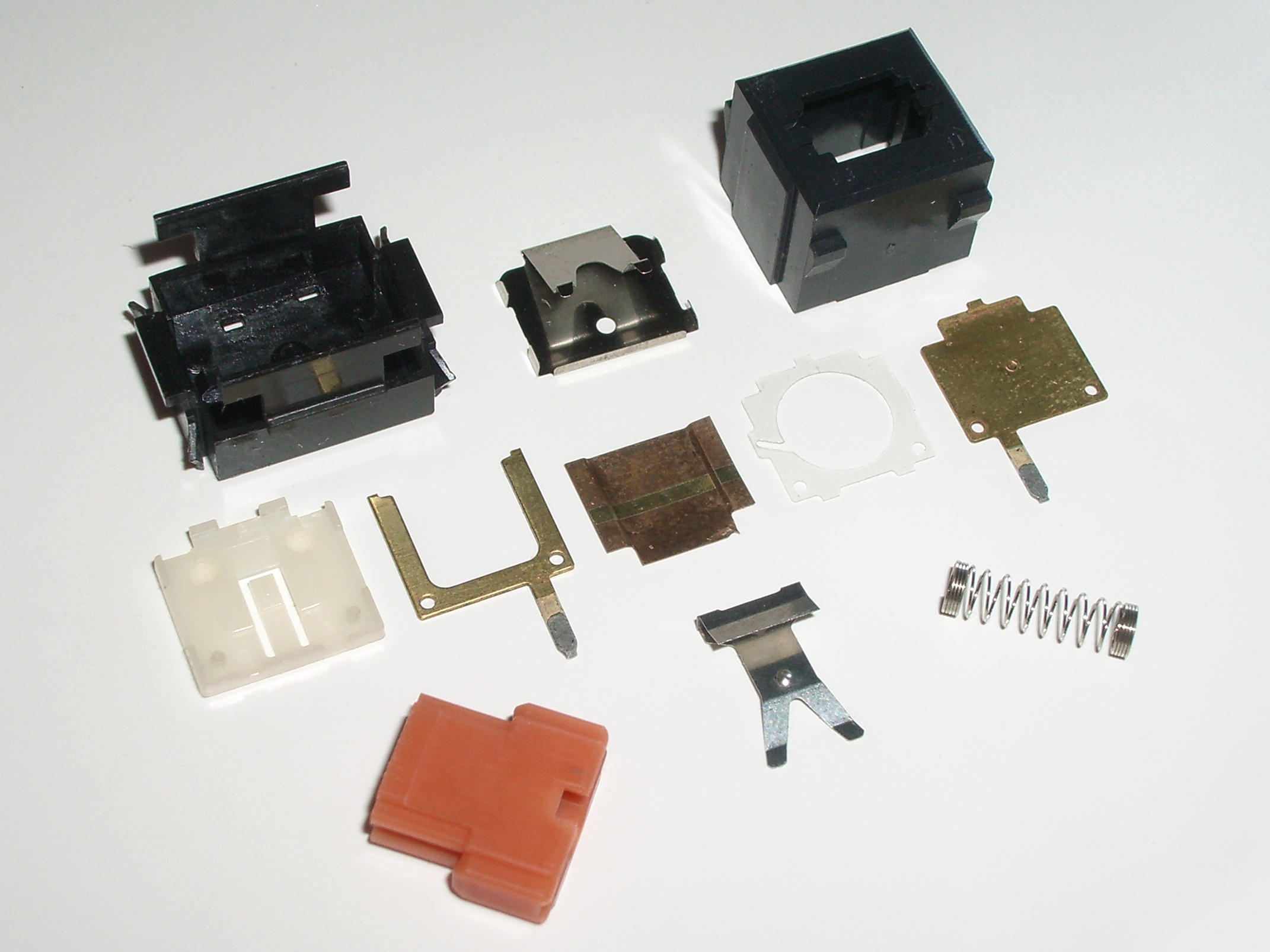
Alps SKCM Orange switch, completely disassembled

== See also ==
- List of mechanical keyboards
- Cherry AG
