= Motorized potentiometer =

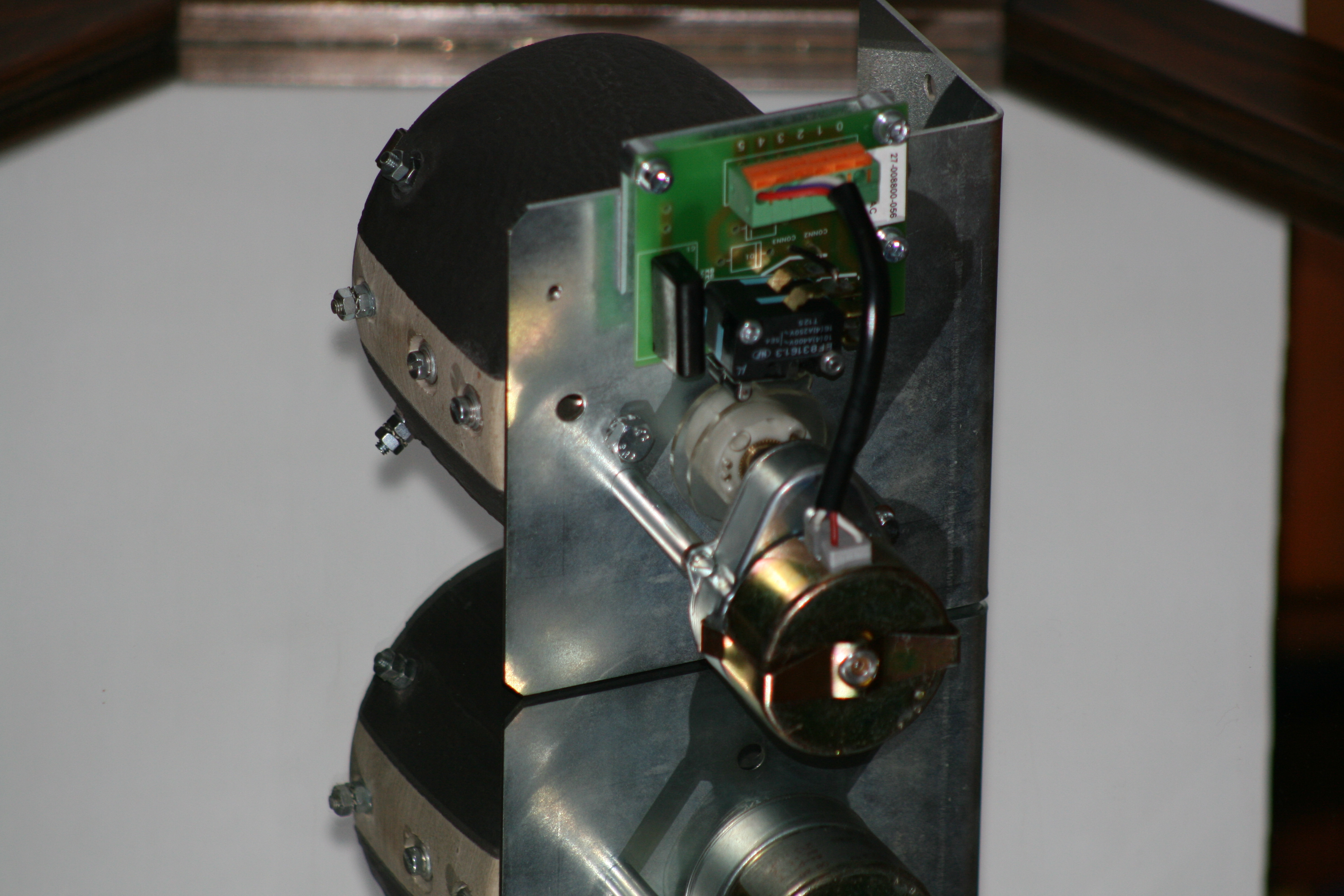
Motorized potentiometer

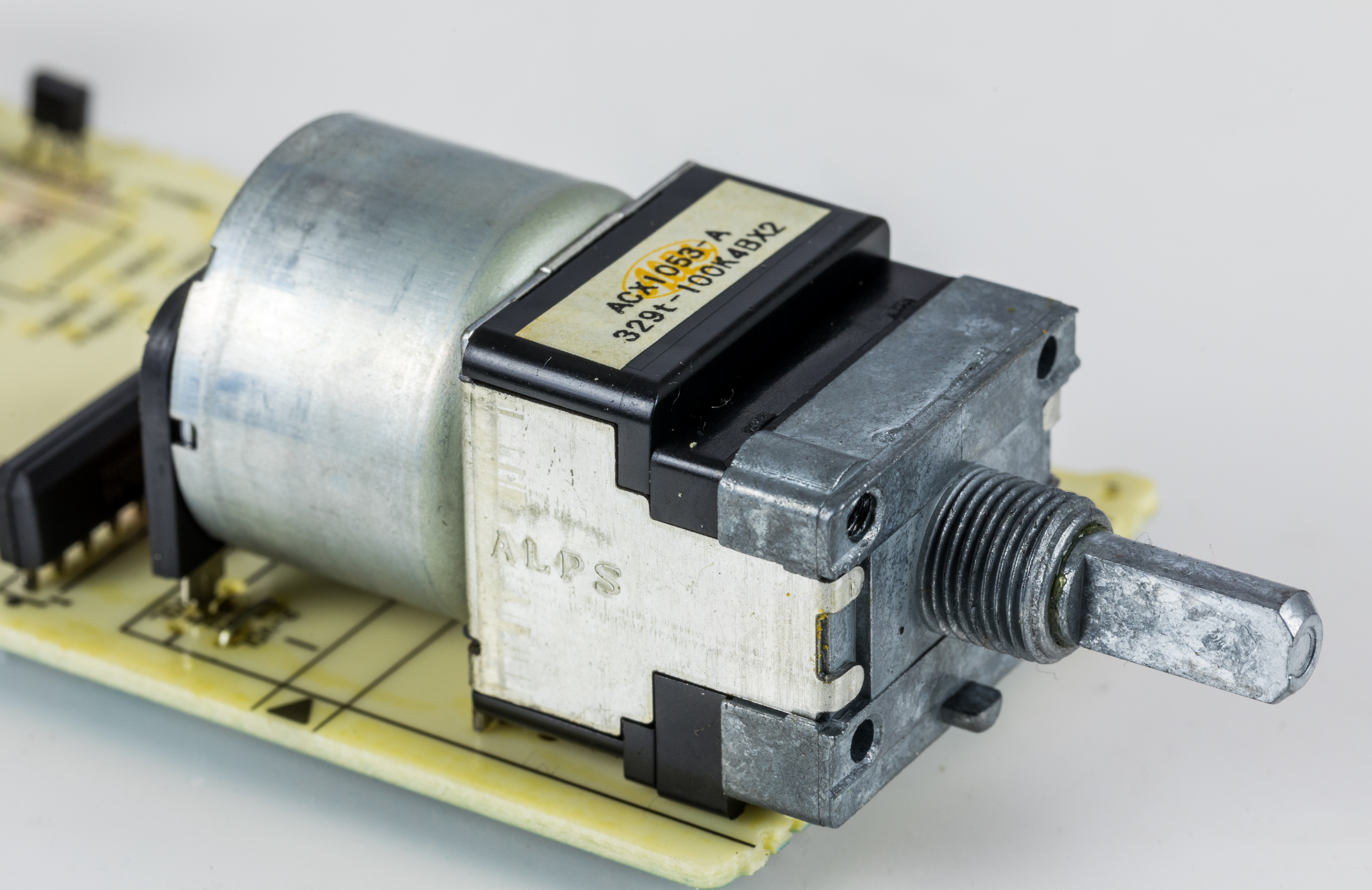
Motorized potentiometer from Alps Electric used in a music center

A motorized potentiometer combines a potentiometer with an electric motor.

== Uses ==
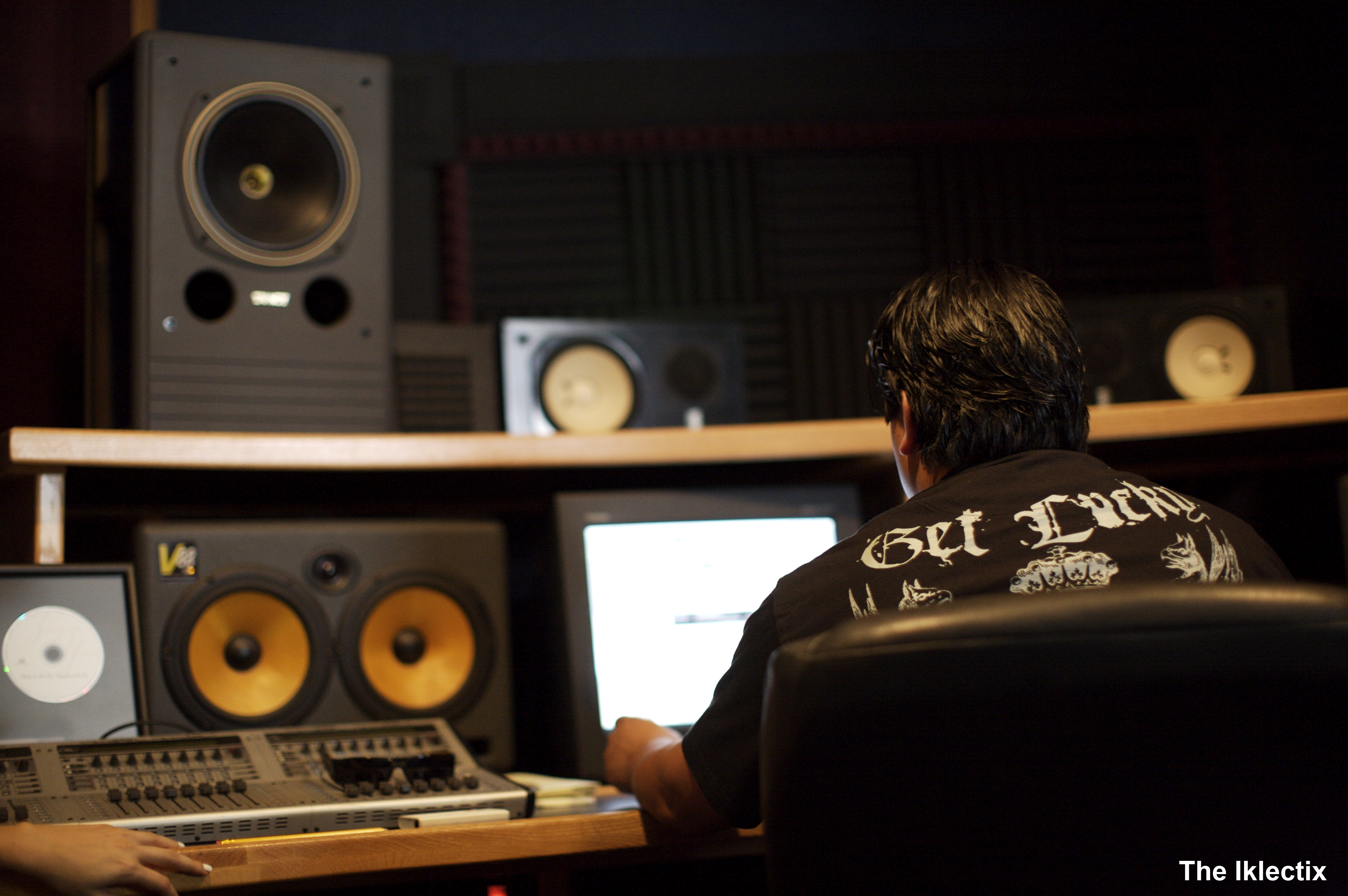
the mixing console on the bottom left has Motorized Faders

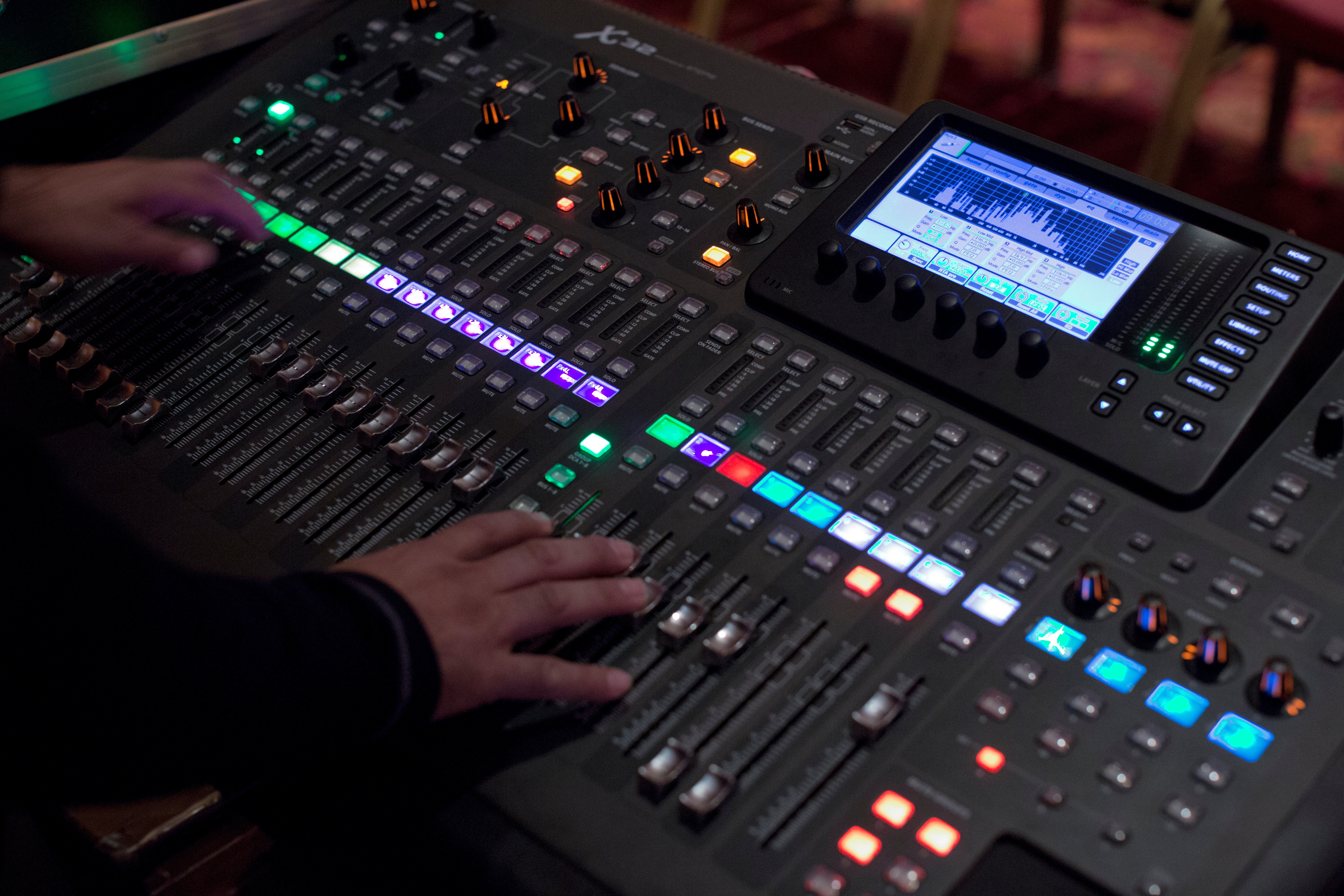
mixing console with Motorized Faders

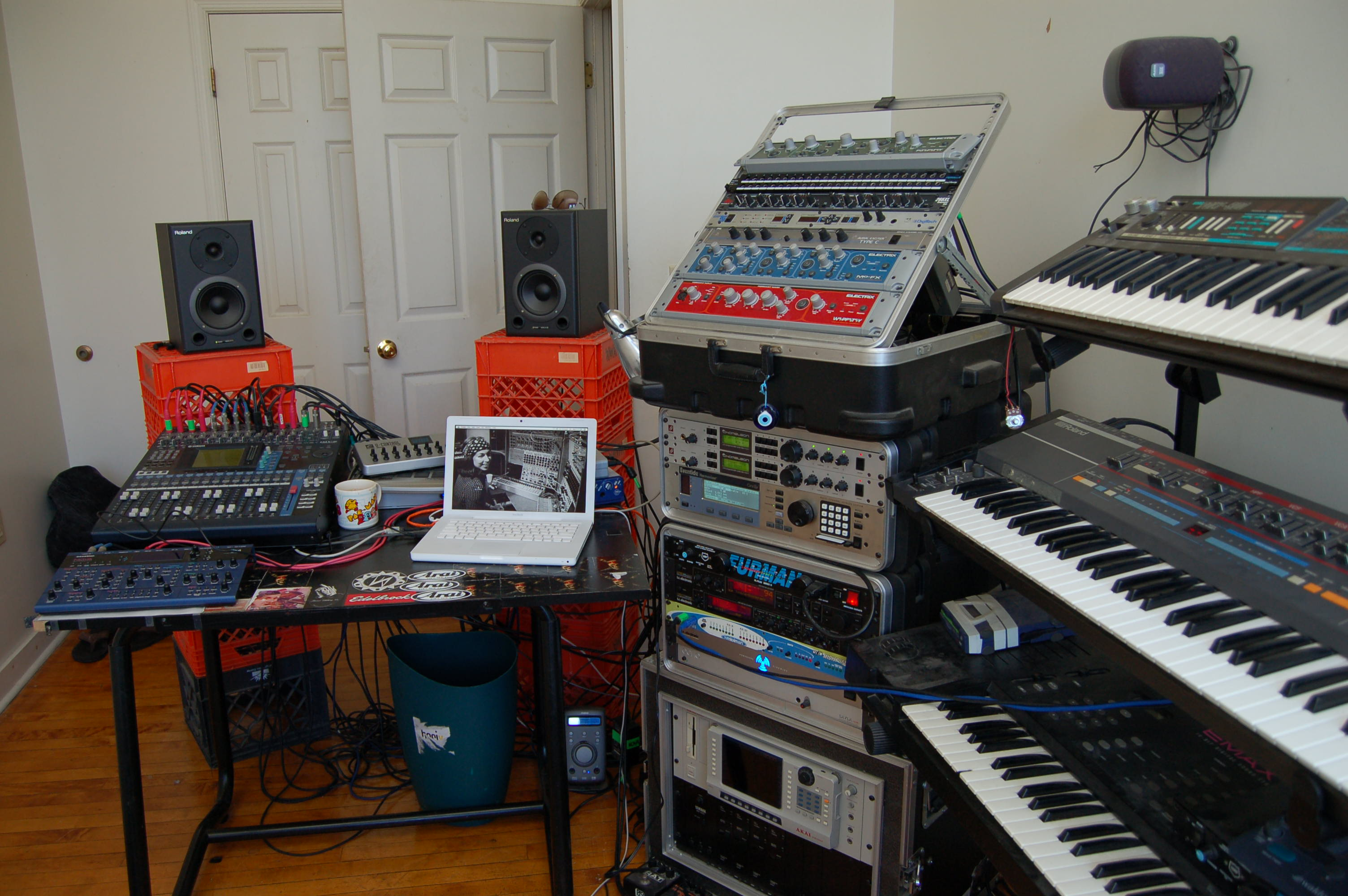
Yamaha 01V96

Motorized potentiometers can be found in audio/video equipment, specifically mixing consoles. In this application, they are called motorized faders. Mixing consoles with motorized faders typically are used to save and restore settings on the same console and sometimes to transfer settings to a different console. Save and restore also allows to control more channels then there are sliders by switching which tracks are controlled. While historically, the faders where literal motorized potentiometers, nowadays faders may directly digitize the fader position and apply the value digitally in the digital signal processing.

Motorized potentiometers are used in industrial controls.

Motorized potentiometers may be used for remote control applications.

Motorized potentiometers can be used to build electrical/electronic analog computers. The motorized potentiometer can act as a computing element, but also as a way to convert a physical into an electrical value.

Radio control servo motors use a potentiometer as feedback for the servo position.

== Features ==
Some motorized potentiometers allow both manual and motorized operation.

Motorized potentiometers can be slide or rotary potentiometers. There also exist multiple turn motorized potentiometers.

The end of travel may be detected using limit switches, a peak in motor current as the mechanism stalls, or a separate resistive element used for position feedback.

== History ==
Given that the history of the motorized potentiometer is linked to electronic analog computers, and electronic analog computers to military use, recording keeping and publication were limited, also meaning that parallel invention was highly likely. The M9 Gun Director had a potentiometer controlled by op amps. The Bomben-Abwurfrechner BT-9 has a motor driven potentiometer to convert a pressure into a potentiometer setting.

In 1968 a patent was filled describing a motor-potentiometer combination where the motor only engages when energized, allowing manual operation.

In 1970 a patent was filled describing a motor-potentiometer with overload clutch and interchangeable gear ratio.

== Manufactures ==
Manufactures are for e.g. Alps Electric.
