= Touchpad =

Type of pointing device

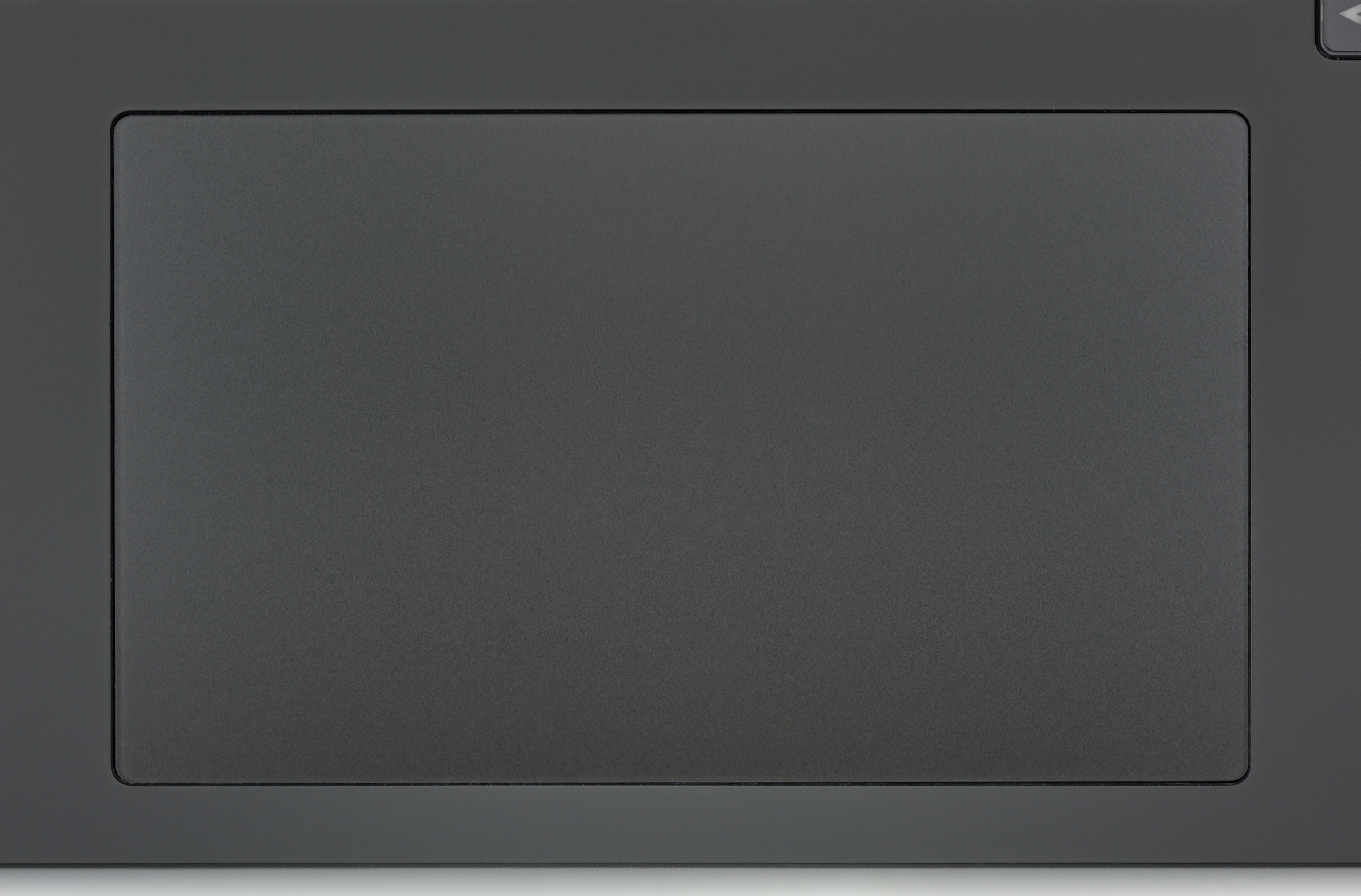
Closeup of a touchpad on an Asus ROG Strix G15 laptop

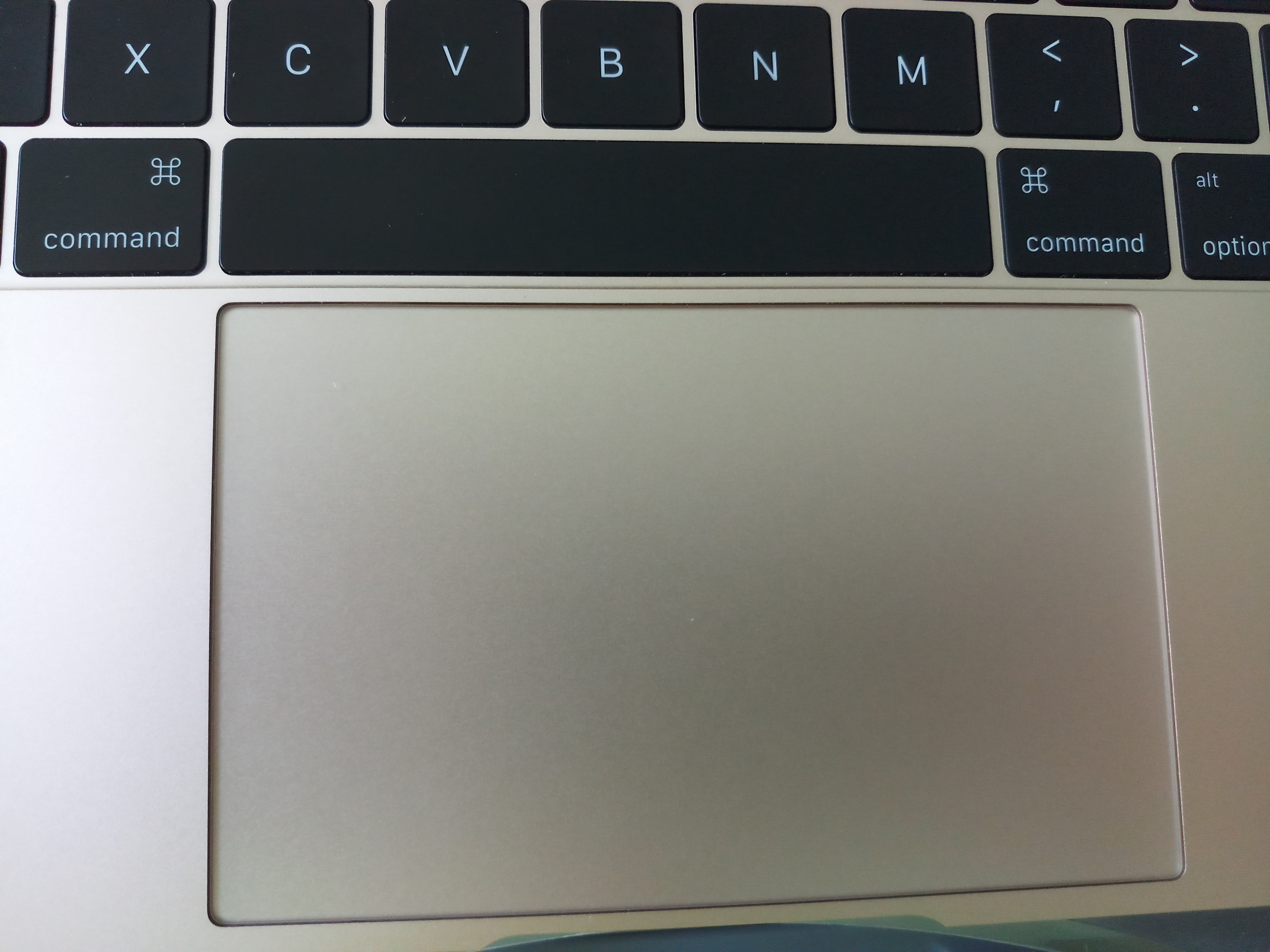
Closeup of a touchpad on a MacBook 2015 laptop

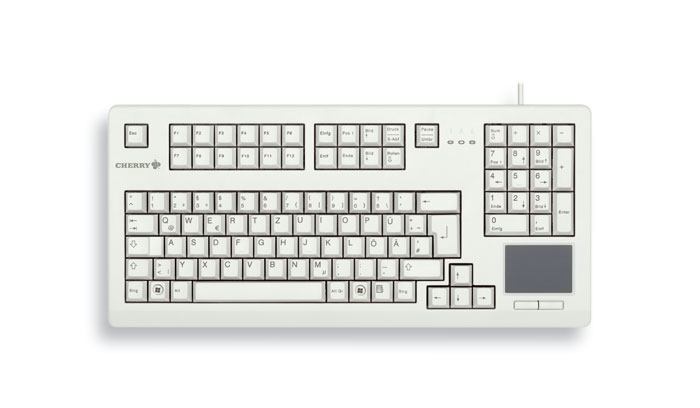
Computer keyboard with integrated touchpad made by Cherry

A touchpad or trackpad is a type of pointing device. Its largest component is a tactile sensor: an electronic device with a flat surface that detects the position and motion of a user's fingers, and translates them into 2D motion to control a pointer in a graphical user interface. Touchpads are common on laptop computers, contrasted with desktop computers, with which mice are more prevalent. Trackpads are sometimes used with desktop setups where desk space is scarce. Wireless touchpads are also available as detached accessories. Due to the ability of trackpads to be made small, they were additionally used on personal digital assistants (PDAs) and some portable media players.

== Operation and function ==
Touchpads operate in several ways, including capacitive sensing or resistive touchscreen. The most common technology used in the 2010s senses the change of capacitance where a finger touches the pad. Capacitance-based touchpads will not sense the tip of a pencil or other similar ungrounded or non-conducting implements. Fingers insulated by a glove may also be problematic, and capacitive touchpads are rarely used as pointing devices for medical hardware.

Like touchscreens, touchpads sense absolute position but their resolution is limited by their size. For common use as a pointer device, the dragging motion of a finger is translated into a finer, relative motion of the cursor on the output to the display on the operating system, analogous to the handling of a mouse that is lifted and put back on a surface. Hardware buttons equivalent to a standard mouse's left and right buttons are sometimes positioned adjacent to the touchpad.

Some touchpads and associated device driver software may interpret tapping the pad as a mouse click, and a tap followed by a continuous pointing motion (a "click-and-a-half") can indicate dragging. Tactile touchpads allow for clicking and dragging by incorporating button functionality into the surface of the touchpad itself. To select, one presses down on the touchpad instead of a physical button. To drag, instead of performing the "click-and-a-half" technique, the user presses down while on the object, drags without releasing pressure, and lets go when done. Touchpad drivers can also allow the use of multiple fingers to emulate the other mouse buttons (commonly two-finger tapping for right click).

Touchpads are called clickpads if they rely on software buttons rather than physical buttons. Physically the whole clickpad formed a button, logically the driver interprets a click as a left or right button click depending on the placement of fingers.

Some touchpads have "hotspots", locations on the touchpad used for functionality beyond a mouse. For example, on certain touchpads, moving the finger along an edge of the touch pad will act as a scroll wheel, controlling the scrollbar and scrolling the window that has the focus, vertically or horizontally. Many touchpads use two-finger dragging for scrolling. Also, some touchpad drivers support tap zones, regions where a tap will execute a function, for example, pausing a media player or launching an application. All of these functions are implemented in the touchpad device driver software, and can be disabled.

== History ==
In 1980, Xerox offered one of the first, if not the first, touchpads on a computer system with their Xerox 860, a word processing workstation aimed at medium- and large-sized businesses. Embedded on the Xerox 860's keyboard, to the right of the keys, is the circular touchpad, which Xerox dubbed the "Cat" (short for capacitance-activated transducer). Xerox offered the Cat as an alternative input method for selecting strings of text to copy, delete, insert, or move around the document.

By 1982, Apollo desktop computers were equipped with a touchpad on the right side of the keyboard. Introduced a year later, in 1983, the first battery-powered clamshell laptop, the Gavilan SC included a touchpad, which was mounted above its keyboard, rather than below, which became the norm.

Psion's MC 200/400/600/WORD Series, introduced in 1989, came with a new mouse-replacing input device similar to a touchpad, although more closely resembling a graphics tablet, as the cursor was positioned by clicking on a specific point on the pad, instead of moving it in the direction of a stroke.

Laptops with touchpads were launched by Olivetti and Triumph-Adler in 1992. Cirque introduced the first widely available touchpad, branded as GlidePoint, in 1994. Apple introduced touchpads with modern placing in the PowerBook 500 series in 1994, using Cirque's GlidePoint technology, which Apple refers to as a "trackpad"; it replaced the trackball of previous PowerBook models. Since 2008, Apple's revisions of the MacBook and MacBook Pro incorporated a "Tactile Touchpad" design with a button integrated into the tracking surface (the lower part of the touchpad surface acts as a clickable button).

Another early adopter of the GlidePoint pointing device was Sharp. Later, Synaptics introduced their touchpad into the marketplace, branded the TouchPad, and Epson was an early adopter of this product with their ActionNote. As touchpads began to be introduced in laptops in the 1990s, there was often confusion as to what the product should be called. No consistent term was used, and references varied, such as: glidepoint, touch sensitive input device, touchpad, trackpad, and pointing device.

Users were often presented with the option to purchase a pointing stick, touchpad, or trackball. Combinations of the devices were common, though touchpads and trackballs were rarely included together. Since the early 2000s, touchpads have become the dominant laptop pointing device as most consumer laptops produced during this period and beyond includes only touchpads, displacing the pointing stick.

== Use in devices ==
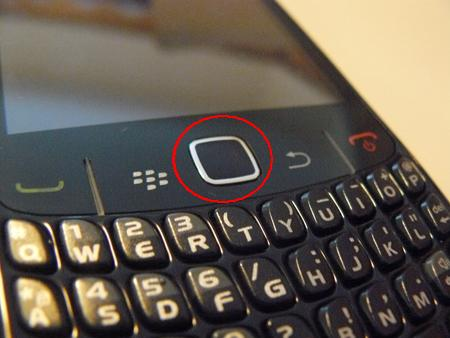
The BlackBerry Curve, a smartphone with an optical trackpad (circled in red)

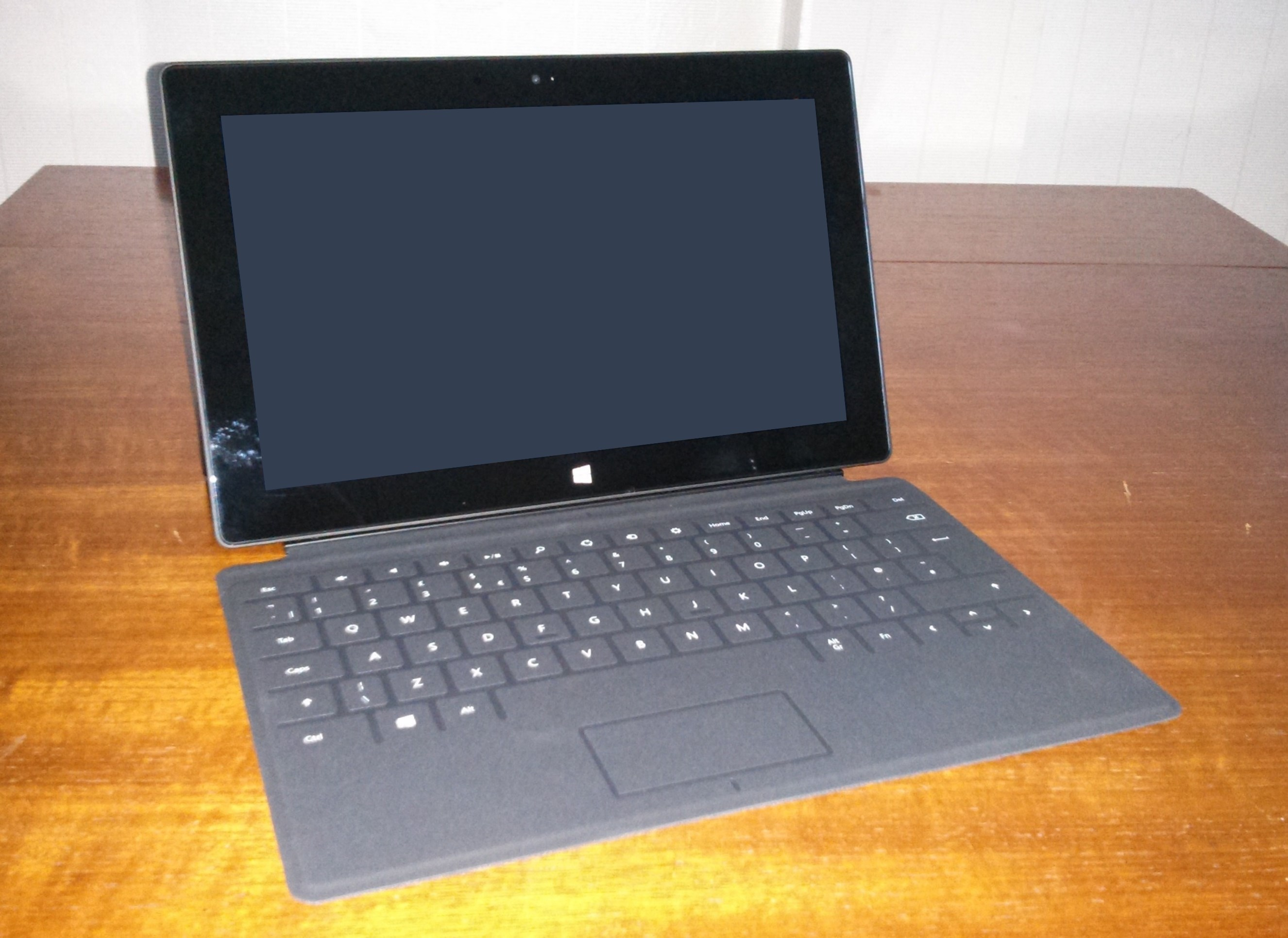
A Microsoft Surface tablet. The touchpad is the rectangle near the bottom of the keyboard.

Touchpads are primarily used in self-contained portable laptop computers and do not require a flat surface near the machine. The touchpad is close to the keyboard, and relatively short finger movements are required to move the cursor across the display screen; while advantageous, this also makes it possible for a user's palm or wrist to move the mouse cursor accidentally while typing. Laptops today feature multitouch touchpads that can sense in some cases up to five fingers simultaneously, providing more options for input, such as the ability to bring up the context menu by tapping two fingers, dragging two fingers for scrolling, or gestures for zoom in/out or rotate. The touchpads with physical buttons now are only high-end business/professional laptops option.

One-dimensional touchpads are the primary control interface for menu navigation on iPod Classic portable music players and additional input method on some Wacom digitizer tablets, where they are referred to as "click wheels", since they only sense motion along one axis, which is wrapped around like a wheel. Creative Labs also uses a touchpad for their Zen line of MP3 players, beginning with the Zen Touch. The second-generation Microsoft Zune product line (the Zune 80/120 and Zune 4/8) uses touch for the Zune Pad.

Touchpads also exist for desktop computers as an external peripheral, albeit rarely seen. But touchpad layer can be integrated with graphics tablet as additional input option.

External computer keyboards can be equipped with integrated touchpads (particularly keyboards oriented for HTPC use), and some keyboards can have only touch input surface instead of hardware buttons (a typical solution for clean rooms).

Optical trackpads primary can be used as part of ultraportable electronics; some handheld laptops and early smartphones can be equipped with optical trackpads.

On September 9, 2024, Apple unveiled the iPhone 16, iPhone 16 Plus, iPhone 16 Pro and iPhone 16 Pro Max to feature the single one-dimensional trackpad next to the side button called "Camera Control" which allows the users to take an easier way to take a photos and videos, the force sensor to distinguish between the firm press and the light press and the capacitance touch sensor to distinguish sliding with finger for adjusting the zoom, exposure or depth-of-field.

== Theory of operation ==
There are two principal means by which touchpads work: the matrix approach and the capacitive shunt method. In the matrix approach, a series of conductors are arranged in an array of parallel lines in two layers, separated by an insulator and crossing each other at right angles to form a grid. A high frequency signal is applied sequentially between pairs in this two-dimensional grid array. The current that passes between the nodes is proportional to the capacitance. When a virtual ground, such as a finger, is placed over one of the intersections between the conductive layer some of the electrical field is shunted to this ground point, resulting in a change in the apparent capacitance at that location. This method received U.S. patent 5,305,017 awarded to George Gerpheide in April 1994.

The capacitive shunt method, described in an application note by manufacturer Analog Devices, senses the change in capacitance between a transmitter and receiver that are on opposite sides of the sensor. The transmitter creates an electric field which oscillates at 200–300 kHz. If a ground point, such as the finger, is placed between the transmitter and receiver, some of the field lines are shunted away, decreasing the apparent capacitance.

Trackpads such as those found in some Blackberry smartphones work optically, like an optical computer mouse.

== Manufacturing ==
Major manufacturers include:

- Alps Electric
- Elan Microelectronics
- Cirque Corporation
- Synaptics

== See also ==
- Capacitive sensing
- Graphics tablet
- Kaoss Pad
- List of touch input manufacturers
- Magic Trackpad
- Multi-touch
- Pointing stick
