= Maxwell Technologies =

American development and manufacturing company

Maxwell Technologies Inc.

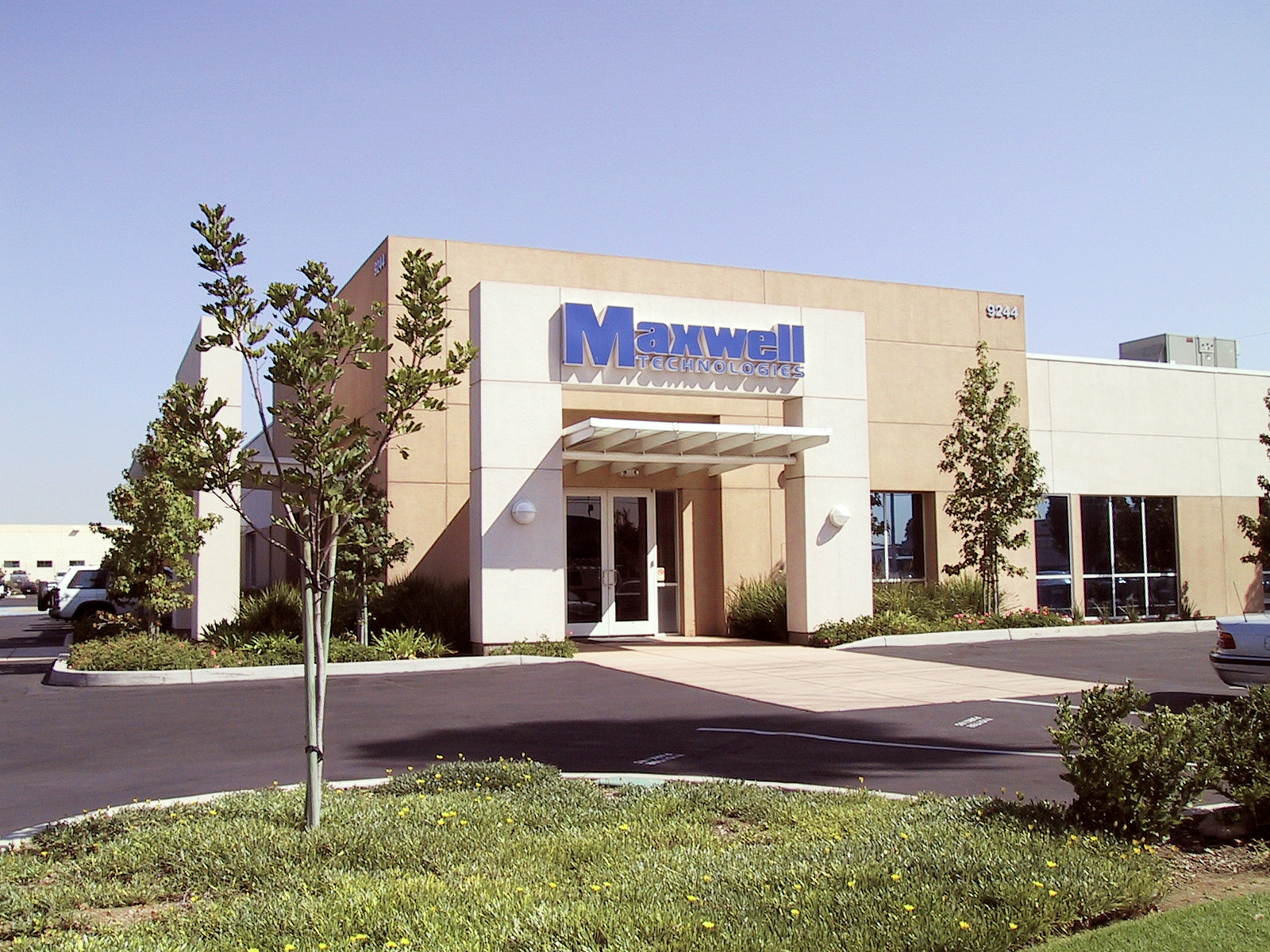
- Headquarters of Maxwell Technologies in San Diego, California
- Type: Subsidiary
- Industry: Energy storage
- Founded: 1965; 61 years ago
- Founders: Raymond C. O'Rourke; Alan Kolb; Bruce Hayworth; Terrence C. Gooding
- Headquarters: 6155 Cornerstone Court East, Ste 210, San Diego, CA 92121
- Products: Ultracapacitors; High-voltage capacitors Engine Start Module (ESM); Backup power systems Power modules
- Revenue: $ 90.5 million (2018)
- Parent: Clarios
- Website: www.maxwell.com

Maxwell Technologies Inc. is an American developer and manufacturer headquartered in San Diego, California. It focuses on developing and manufacturing energy storage and power delivery products for automotive, heavy transportation, renewable energy, backup power, wireless communications and industrial and consumer electronics applications.

== History ==
The company was founded in 1965 as Maxwell Laboratories Inc. by Raymond O'Rourke, Alan Kolb, Bruce Hayworth, and Terrence Gooding in San Diego, California. It was originally a government contractor, providing advanced physics, pulsed power, space effects analysis and other research and development services to the U.S. military and other government agencies.

The company began converting its focus to commercial applications for its technologies and products in the early 1990s, and by 2014, generated all of its revenue from commercial sources. In 1996, Maxwell Laboratories, Inc. changed its name to Maxwell Technologies, Inc.

Maxwell Energy Products, a division that included the Maxwell High Voltage Capacitor product line, was acquired in March 2000 by General Atomics, eventually merging into General Atomics Electronic Systems, Inc. in 2003.

In 2007, Maxwell Technologies won US$3 million contract from Astrium Satellites to supply computers for European Space Agency’s ‘Gaia’ Astronomy mission. Maxwell supplied seven Maxwell SCS750 SBCs to process images and data gathered by the satellite's camera.

In November 2013, Maxwell opened a manufacturing facility in Peoria, Arizona. In December, the firm signed a memorandum of understanding (MOU) with SK Innovation to develop the next generation of electrical energy storage with Maxwell's ultracapacitors and SK's lithium-ion batteries.

In April 2016, Maxwell Technologies completed the sale of its microelectronics product line to Data Device Corporation. The following year, it acquired all assets, "core business and operating entities" of Nesscap Energy Inc. for $23.175 million.

In February 2019, electric vehicle and clean energy company Tesla, Inc. announced that it planned to acquire Maxwell Technologies. The deal closed on May 15, 2019, for US$218 million. In July 2021, Tesla sold Maxwell Technologies branding and ultracapacitor business to a San Diego–based startup called Ucap Power, led by the former vice-president of sales for Maxwell, Gordon Schenk.

In November 2025, it was announced that the company had been sold to Clarios for an undisclosed amount.
