= Gesture-enhanced single-touch =

Gesture-enhanced single-touch, also known as "dual control", "gesture touch", and often "dual-touch", describes the ability of a touchscreen to register certain two-finger gestures, despite lacking hardware that would allow it to fully register all two-finger movements. A very common application of gesture-enhanced single-touch technology is the pinch-to-zoom gesture, which allows the user to zoom in or out by moving two fingers further apart or closer together while touching the display.

== Technical background ==
An important technical reason for the limitation to gesture-enhanced single-touch instead of allowing dual-touch or multi-touch is the type of sensor hardware in the display. Many touchscreen technologies obtain two independent measurements per touch to acquire a 2-dimensional position. Given two distinct touches, however, this returns two pairs of measurements, which can be combined in two ways, producing an ambiguous result. Thus, it is not possible to exactly determine the position of two distinct touches. Still, the average position can be approximated, as well as the distance between the touches, which suffices for some gesture applications.

== See also ==
- Multi-touch
