= Frank Beck =

Frank Beck may refer to:

- Frank Beck (baseball) (1860–1941), American baseball player
- Frank Beck (British Army officer) (1861–1915)
- Frank Beck (computer scientist) (1930–2020), British computer scientist
- Frank Beck (sex offender) (1942–1994), English child sex offender
- Frank Beck (fencer) (born 1961), German Olympic fencer
- Frank Ver Beck (1858–1933), American illustrator
