= Sensacell =

Touchscreen display technology

Sensacell is an interactive interface technology developed by the Sensacell Corporation. A Sensacell surface functions is an interactive touchscreen display, but on a large-scale framework. Individual tile-like modules—each containing LED (Light-emitting diode) lighting and capacitive sensors—are connected in an open-ended array. As the sensors can read through solid materials. A constructed surface essentially functions as a multi-touch touchscreen, but with additional capabilities due to the nature of the capacitive sensors used in the tiles. The sensing electrodes can detect, without physical contact, persons and objects moving in proximity to the surface, to a distance of 150mm. The ability to detect proximity provides a third variable of user input. A traditional touchscreen collects information on the two-dimensional plane of the surface itself; a “touch” or other input is translated into x-axis and y-axis coordinates on a Cartesian grid. Sensacell surfaces can track the relative distance of an object, adding a three-dimensional, or z-axis coordinate, data object that can be captured and processed. The technology was developed by Leo Fernekes and architect Joakim Hannerz in 2004.

== See also ==
- Graphics tablet
- Graphics tablet-screen hybrid
- Multi-touch
- Tablet PC
- Touchpad
- Touchscreen
