= Casio PB-1000 =

Handheld computer manufactured by Casio

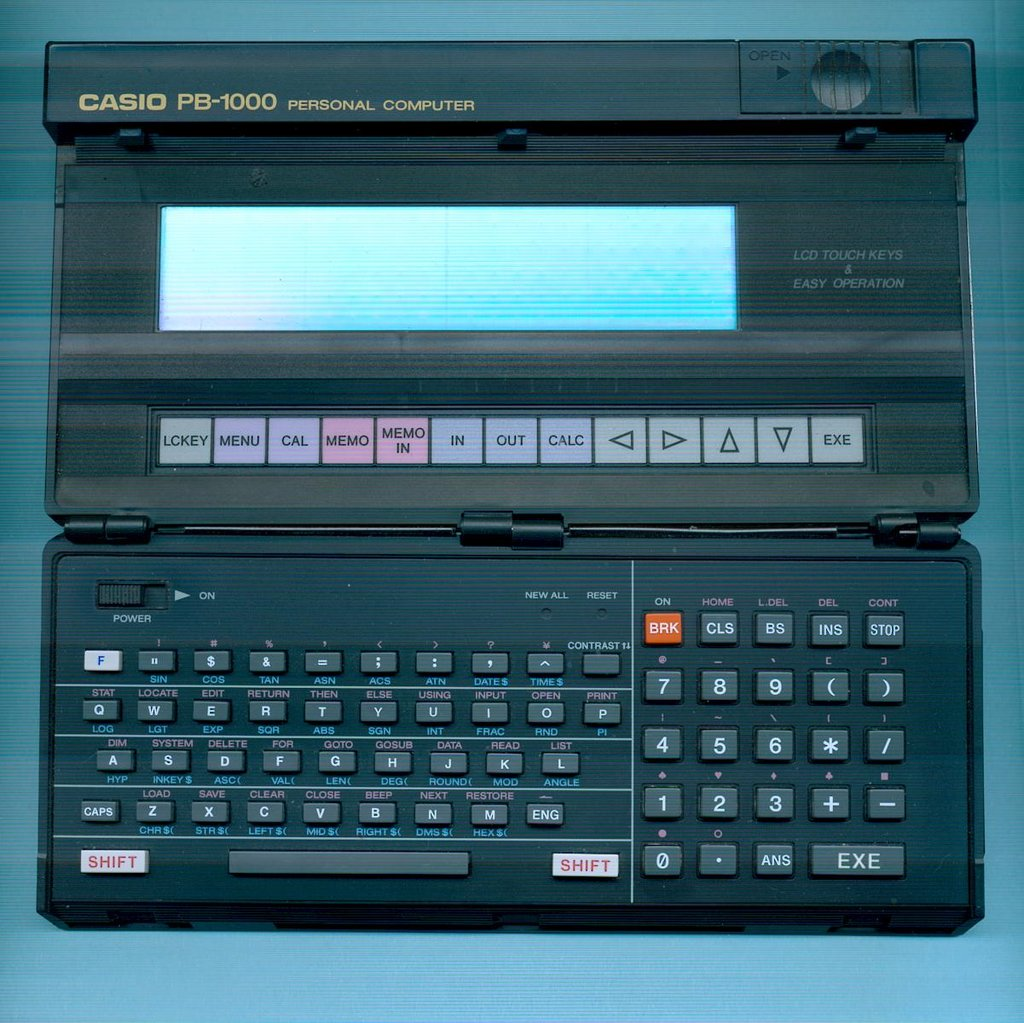
- Casio PB-1000
- Manufacturer: Casio
- Released: 1987
- CPU: Hitachi HD61700 (CMOS)
- Memory: 8K RAM (40K optional)
- Storage: (options) MD-100 floppy disk unit, FA-7 tape interface (both devices include a printer port and an RS-232 interface)
- Display: LCD, 192*32 pixels, 32x4 chars (32x8 chars virtual), 4x4 touch screen
- Camera: None
- Connectivity: RS-232C
- Power: 3 AA batteries (55-100 hours at 0.14W)
- Dimensions: 24x187x97mm (closed)
- Weight: 435 g (15.3 oz)

The Casio PB-1000 is a handheld computer released by Casio in 1987 (Released in Japan in 1986). It featured a touchscreen display which consisted of 16 keys built into the screen, arranged in fixed positions on a four by four matrix.

The computer itself included 8Kb of RAM and it was possible to install a 32Kb memory expansion card.

The PB-1000 was programmable in both a custom version of the BASIC language and an assembly language.

The PB-1000C, one of the variants released only in Japan, has the CASL assembly language for the educational COMET simulator instead of the HD61700 assembly language. The differences include the implementation of binary and octal calculation instructions in the BASIC language (&B,BIN$,&O,OCT$), the Tab ↹ key, and the line jumping in the screen editor.

== See also ==
- Casio calculator character sets
