= Touchscreen =

Input and output device

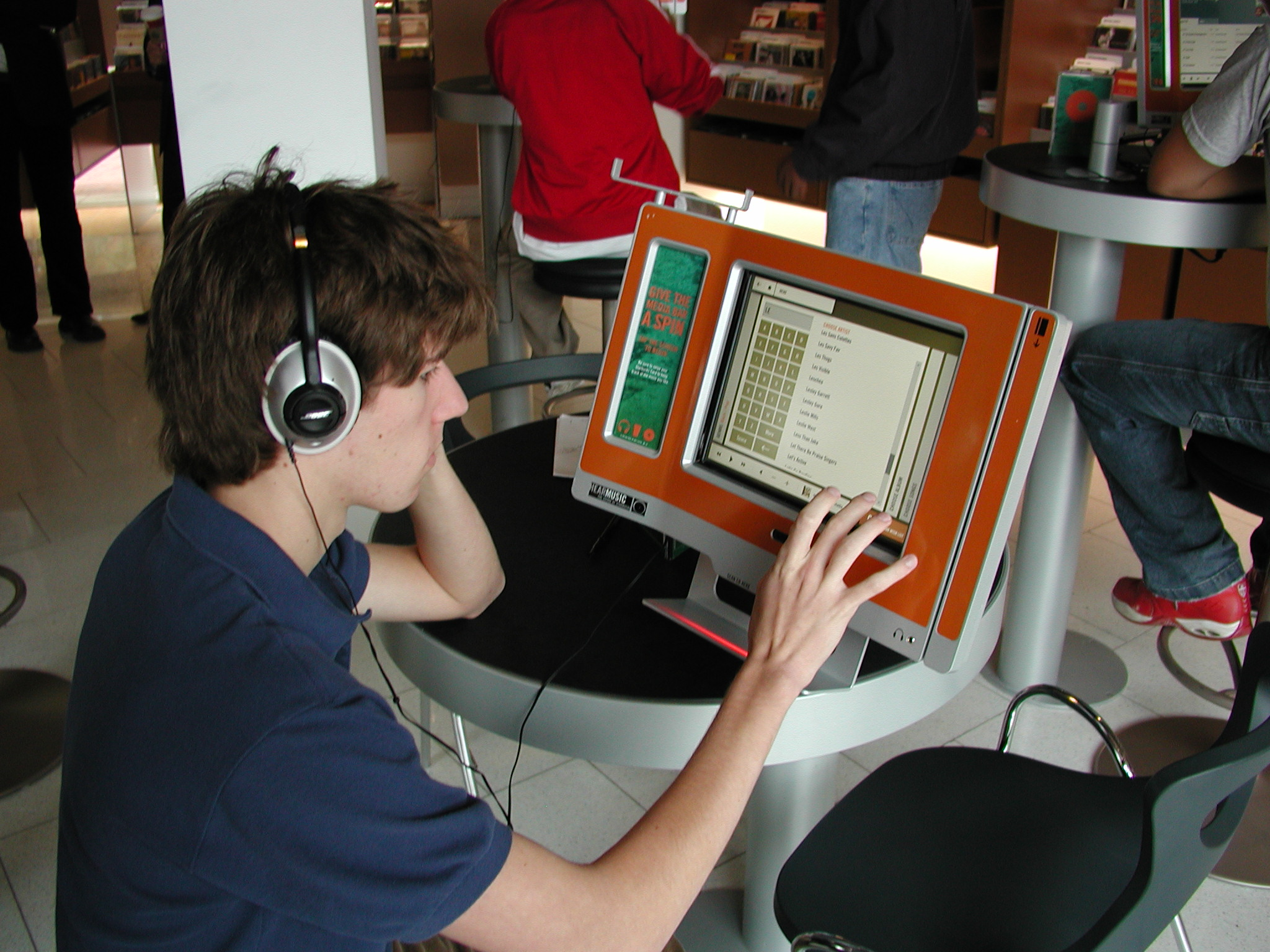
A user operating a touchscreen

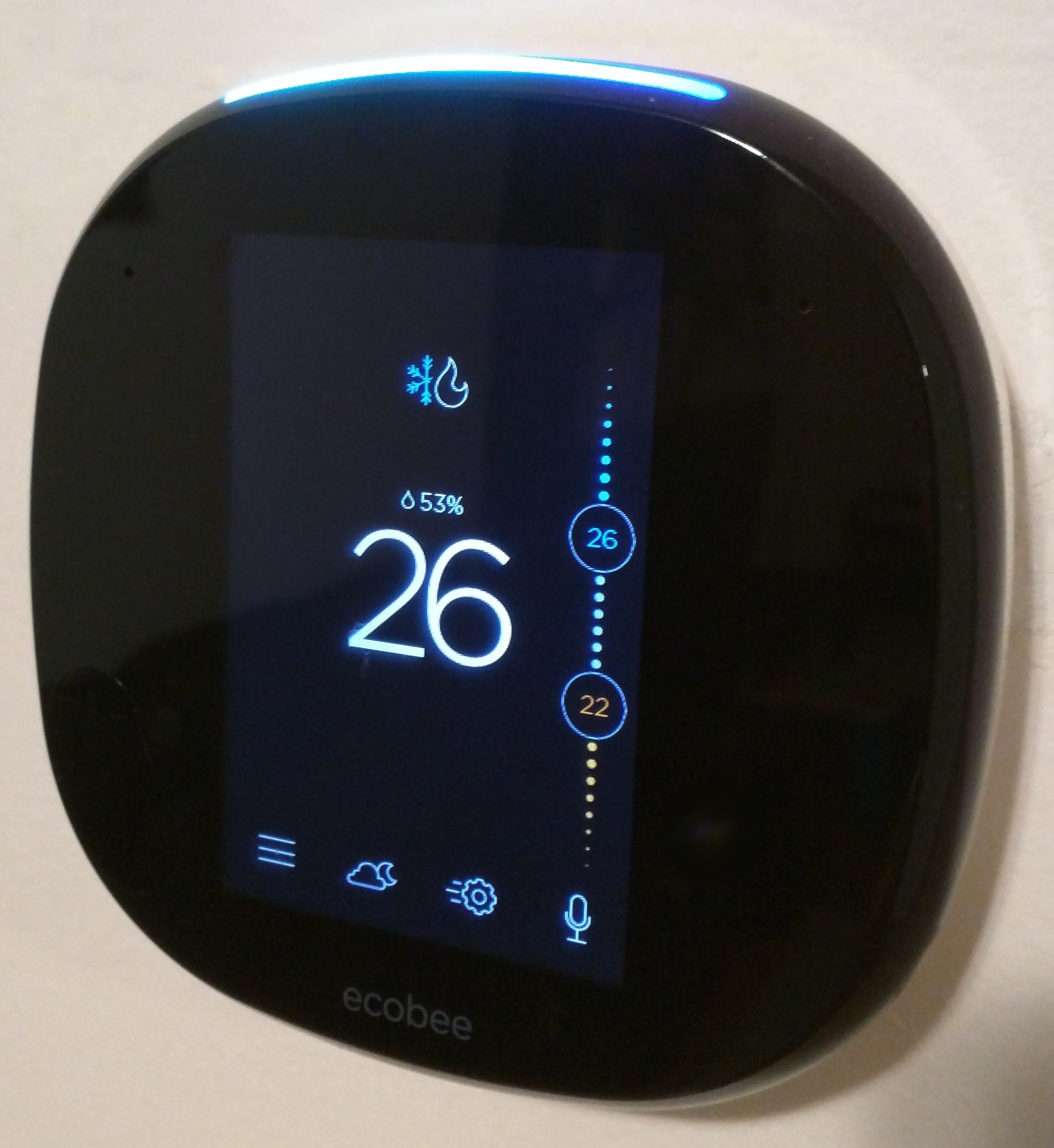
Smart thermostat with touchscreen

A touchscreen (or touch screen) is a type of display that can detect touch input from a user to do a specific task. It consists of both an input device (a touch panel) and an output device (a visual display). The touch panel is typically layered on the top of the electronic visual display of a device. Touchscreens are commonly found in smartphones, tablets, laptops, and other electronic devices. The display is often an LCD, AMOLED or OLED display.

A person can give input or control the information processing system through simple or multi-touch gestures by touching the screen with a special stylus or one or more fingers. Some touchscreens use ordinary or specially coated gloves to work, while others may only work using a special stylus or pen. The user can use the touchscreen to react to what is displayed and, if the software allows, to control how it is displayed; for example, zooming to increase the text size.

A touchscreen allows users to interact directly with on-screen content, rather than using indirect input devices such as a mouse or touchpad. Touchscreens are commonly found on smartphones, tablets, kiosks, and many modern laptops, where they allow tapping, swiping, and pinching to perform actions on the screen.

Touchscreens are common in devices such as smartphones, handheld game consoles, and personal computers. They are common in point-of-sale (POS) systems, automated teller machines (ATMs), electronic voting machines, and automobile infotainment systems and controls. They can also be attached to computers or, as terminals, to networks. They play a prominent role in the design of digital appliances such as personal digital assistants (PDAs) and some e-readers. Touchscreens are important in educational settings such as classrooms or on college campuses.

The popularity of smartphones, tablets, and many types of information appliances has driven the demand and acceptance of common touchscreens for portable and functional electronics. Touchscreens are found in the medical field, heavy industry, automated teller machines (ATMs), and kiosks such as museum displays or room automation, where keyboard and mouse systems do not allow a suitably intuitive, rapid, or accurate interaction by the user with the display's content.

Historically, the touchscreen sensor and its accompanying controller-based firmware have been made available by a wide array of after-market system integrators, and not by display, chip, or motherboard manufacturers. Display manufacturers and chip manufacturers have acknowledged the trend toward acceptance of touchscreens as a user interface component and have begun to integrate touchscreens into the fundamental design of their products.

== History ==
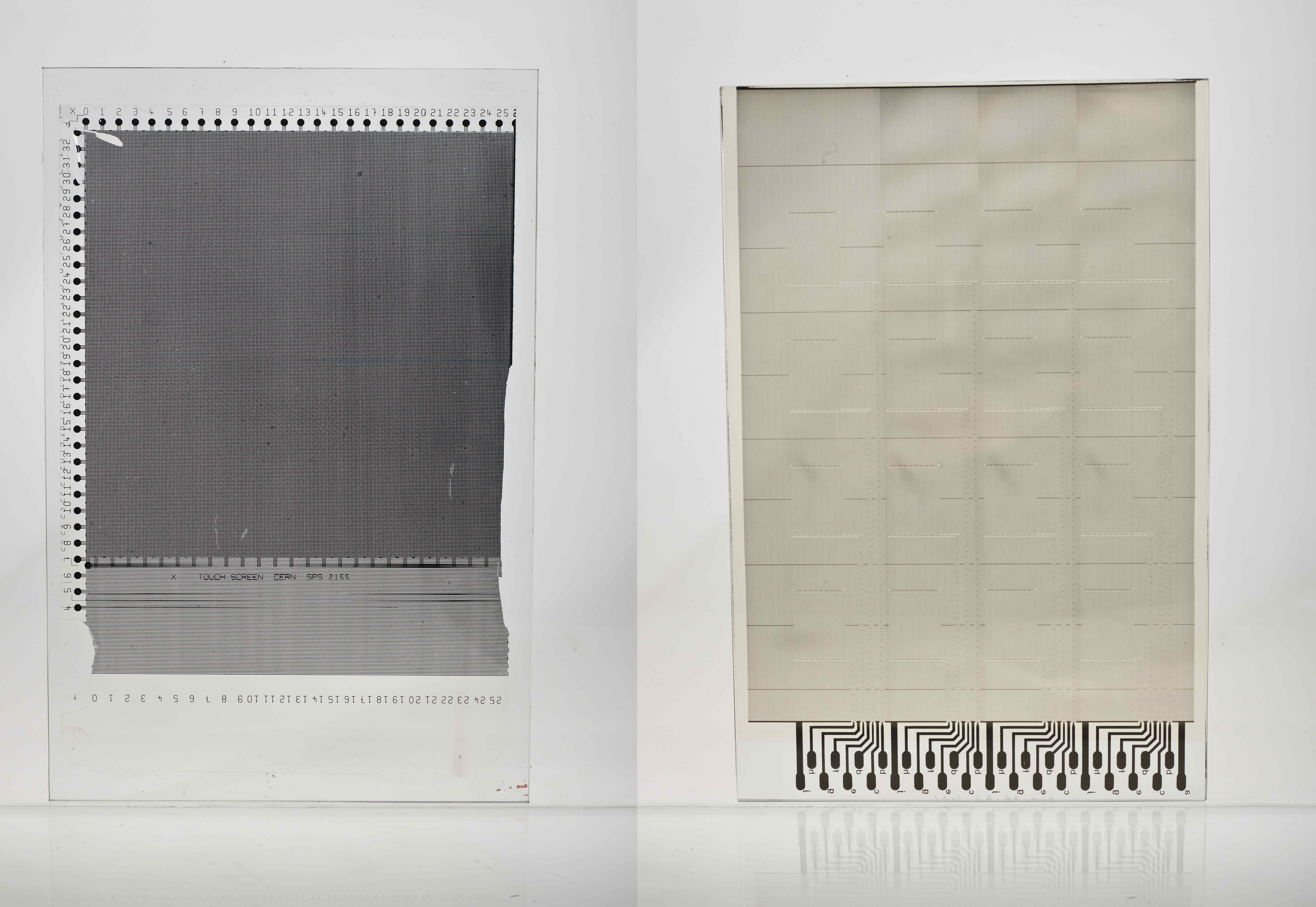
The prototype x-y mutual capacitance touchscreen (left) developed at CERN in 1977 by Frank Beck, a British electronics engineer, for the control room of CERN's Super Proton Synchrotron. This was a further development of the self-capacitance screen (right), also developed by Stumpe at CERN in 1972.

=== Early predecessors (1940s–1960s) ===
One predecessor of the modern touchscreen includes stylus-based systems. In 1946, a patent was filed by Philco Company for a stylus designed for sports telecasting which, when placed against an intermediate cathode-ray tube (CRT) display, would amplify and add to the original signal. Effectively, this was used for temporarily drawing arrows or circles onto a live television broadcast, as described in US 2487641A, Denk, William E, "Electronic pointer for television images", issued 8 November 1949.

The first version of a touchscreen which operated independently of the light produced from the screen was patented by AT&T Corporation in 1962 US 3016421A, Harmon, Leon D, "Electrographic transmitter", issued 9 January 1962. This touchscreen utilized a matrix of collimated lights shining orthogonally across the touch surface. When a beam is interrupted by a stylus, the photodetectors which no longer receive a signal can be used to determine where the interruption is. Later iterations of matrix-based touchscreens built upon this by adding more emitters and detectors to improve resolution, pulsing emitters to improve optical signal to noise ratio, and using a nonorthogonal matrix to remove shadow readings during multi-touch. In 1963, Robert E. Graham patented an "indirect" light-pen telewriting apparatus that allowed users to draw on a separate surface while the system electronically transmitted and reproduced the strokes on a computer display, reducing the mechanical limitations of earlier stylus-based systems.

The first finger-driven touchscreen was developed by Eric Johnson of the Royal Radar Establishment located in Malvern, England. He described his work on capacitive touchscreens in a short article published in 1965 and then more fully—with photographs and diagrams—in 1967. Around the same time, an ultrasonic-curtain-based pointing device was developed by a team around Rainer Mallebrein at Telefunken Konstanz for an air traffic control system. In 1970, this evolved into a device named "Touchinput-Einrichtung" ("touch input facility") for the SIG 50 terminal, utilizing a conductively coated glass screen in front of the display. This was patented in 1971. The application of touch technology for air traffic control was further described in an article published in 1968.

=== Capacitive and resistive displays (1970s) ===
Frank Beck and Bent Stumpe, engineers from CERN, developed a transparent touchscreen in the early 1970s based on Stumpe's work at a television factory in the early 1960s. Manufactured by CERN and later by industry partners, it was put to use in 1973. While earlier capacitive touchscreens (like Johnson's) worked by directly touching wires across the front of the screen, Stumpe and Beck developed a self-capacitance touchscreen in 1972, and a mutual capacitance touchscreen in 1977 that could sense the finger by direct touch or through a thin insulating film. A 1973 article published by the pair indicated their device was capable of multi-touch, though this feature was purposely inhibited by software at the time.

In 1972, a group at the University of Illinois filed for a patent on an optical touchscreen that became a standard part of the Magnavox Plato IV Student Terminal. These touchscreens had a crossed array of 16×16 infrared position sensors mounted in front of a monochrome plasma display panel, capable of sensing any fingertip-sized opaque object in close proximity to the screen.

In 1977, American company Elographics—in partnership with Siemens—began work on developing a transparent implementation of an existing opaque touchpad technology developed by Elographics' founder George Samuel Hurst. The resulting resistive technology touch screen was first shown at the World's Fair at Knoxville in 1982.

=== Commercial expansion (1980s) ===
Multi-touch technology saw further development in 1982, when the University of Toronto's Input Research Group developed the first human-input multi-touch system using a frosted-glass panel with a camera placed behind the glass. In 1985, the group, including Bill Buxton, developed a multi-touch tablet that used capacitance rather than bulky camera-based optical sensing systems.

Also in 1983, an optical touchscreen utilizing infrared transmitters and receivers was used on the HP-150, making it one of the world's earliest commercial touchscreen computers. Bob Boie of AT&T Bell Labs used capacitance to track the mechanical changes in thickness of a soft, deformable overlay membrane when physical objects interacted with it, allowing the flexible surface to be easily replaced if damaged. While derivative sources retrospectively described this as a major multi-touch advancement, no evidence indicates Boie ever patented a rugged multi-touch capacitive touchscreen suitable for modern mobile devices.

The 1980s saw touchscreens integrated into various consumer and industrial applications. Touch-sensitive control-display units (CDUs) were evaluated for commercial aircraft flight decks in the early 1980s to reduce pilot workload and improve situational awareness. General Motors also tasked its Delco Electronics division with replacing an automobile's non-essential functions with a monochrome CRT touchscreen known as the Electronic Control Center (ECC). Featured on the 1986–1989 Buick Riviera and 1988–1989 Buick Reatta, the ECC ultimately proved unpopular due to technical problems and consumer technophobia. In 1985, the first commercially available graphical point-of-sale (POS) software, ViewTouch, was demonstrated on the 16-bit Atari 520ST color computer. During Expo 88 in Brisbane, Australia, 56 touch screen information consoles (modified Sony Videotex Workstations) were deployed to provide expo visitors with digital information.

Consumer electronics also adopted early touch technology. Fujitsu released a touch pad for the Micro 16 in 1984 to accommodate complex kanji characters. Sega released graphic tablets like the Terebi Oekaki for the SG-1000 in 1985, and a graphic touch tablet for the Sega AI Computer in 1986. Casio launched the Casio PB-1000 pocket computer in 1987 with a 4×4 matrix touchscreen.

Touchscreens had a reputation for being imprecise until 1988, when researchers at the University of Maryland Human–Computer Interaction Lab (HCIL) introduced the "Lift-off strategy." This provided visual feedback as users touched the screen, allowing them to adjust their finger position before the action took place upon lift-off, enabling the selection of tiny targets down to a single pixel on a VGA screen.

=== Mobile integration and multi-touch (1990s–present) ===
In 1990, Sears et al. published a review of academic research on single and multi-touch human–computer interaction, describing gestures such as swiping the screen and adjusting sliders. The HCIL team developed small touchscreen keyboards and multi-touch gestures. Their demonstration of a touchscreen slider was later cited as prior art in lock screen patent litigations.

Between 1991 and 1992, the Sun Star7 prototype PDA implemented a touchscreen with inertial scrolling. In 1993, IBM released the IBM Simon, widely considered the first touchscreen phone, while Bob Boie of AT&T Bell Labs patented a capacitive keypad/mouse. Despite early interest, Sega abandoned plans for a touchscreen successor to the Game Gear in the early 1990s due to the high cost of the technology, and touchscreens were not popularly used for video games until the release of the Nintendo DS in 2004.

The technology saw a massive commercial breakthrough in the 2000s. Apple patented its multi-touch capacitive touchscreen for mobile devices in 2004, and the first mobile phone to feature a capacitive touchscreen was the LG Prada, released in May 2007, shortly before the first iPhone. By 2009, touchscreen-enabled phones were rapidly gaining popularity, and by the fourth quarter of 2009, a majority of smartphones shipped globally featured touchscreens rather than traditional physical keys. In April 2015, the Apple Watch introduced consumer force-sensitive displays, allowing screens to sense how hard a user is touching the surface in addition to tracking multi-touch points.

== Technologies ==
There are a number of touchscreen technologies, with different methods of sensing touch.

=== Resistive ===
A resistive touchscreen panel is composed of several thin layers, the most important of which are two transparent electrically resistive layers facing each other with a thin gap between them. The top layer (the layer that is touched) has a coating on the underside surface; just beneath it is a similar resistive layer on top of its substrate. One layer has conductive connections along its sides, while the other along the top and bottom. A voltage is applied to one layer and sensed by the other. When an object, such as a fingertip or stylus tip, presses down onto the outer surface, the two layers touch to become connected at that point. The panel then behaves as a pair of voltage dividers, one axis at a time. By rapidly switching between each layer, the position of pressure on the screen can be detected.

Resistive touch is used in restaurants, factories, and hospitals due to its high tolerance for liquids and contaminants. A major benefit of resistive-touch technology is its low cost. Additionally, they may be used with gloves on, or by using anything rigid as a finger substitute, as only sufficient pressure is necessary for the touch to be sensed. Disadvantages include the need to press down, and a risk of damage by sharp objects. Resistive touchscreens also suffer from poorer contrast, due to having additional reflections (i.e. glare) from the layers of material placed over the screen. This type of touchscreen has been used by Nintendo in the DS family, the 3DS family, and the Wii U GamePad.

Due to their simple structure, with very few inputs, resistive touchscreens are mainly used for single touch operation, although some two touch versions (often described as multi-touch) are available. However, there are some true multi-touch resistive touchscreens available. These need many more inputs, and rely on x/y multiplexing to keep the I/O count down.

One example of a true multi-touch resistive touchscreen can detect 10 fingers at the same time. This has 80 I/O connections. These are possibly split 34 x inputs / 46 y outputs, forming a standard 3:4 aspect ratio touchscreen with 1564 x/y intersecting touch sensing nodes.

=== Surface acoustic wave ===
Surface acoustic wave (SAW) technology uses ultrasonic waves that pass over the touchscreen panel. When the panel is touched, a portion of the wave is absorbed. The change in ultrasonic waves is processed by the controller to determine the position of the touch event. Surface acoustic wave touchscreen panels can be damaged by outside elements. Contaminants on the surface can also interfere with the functionality of the touchscreen.

SAW devices have a wide range of applications, including delay lines, filters, correlators and DC to DC converters.

=== Capacitive touchscreen ===
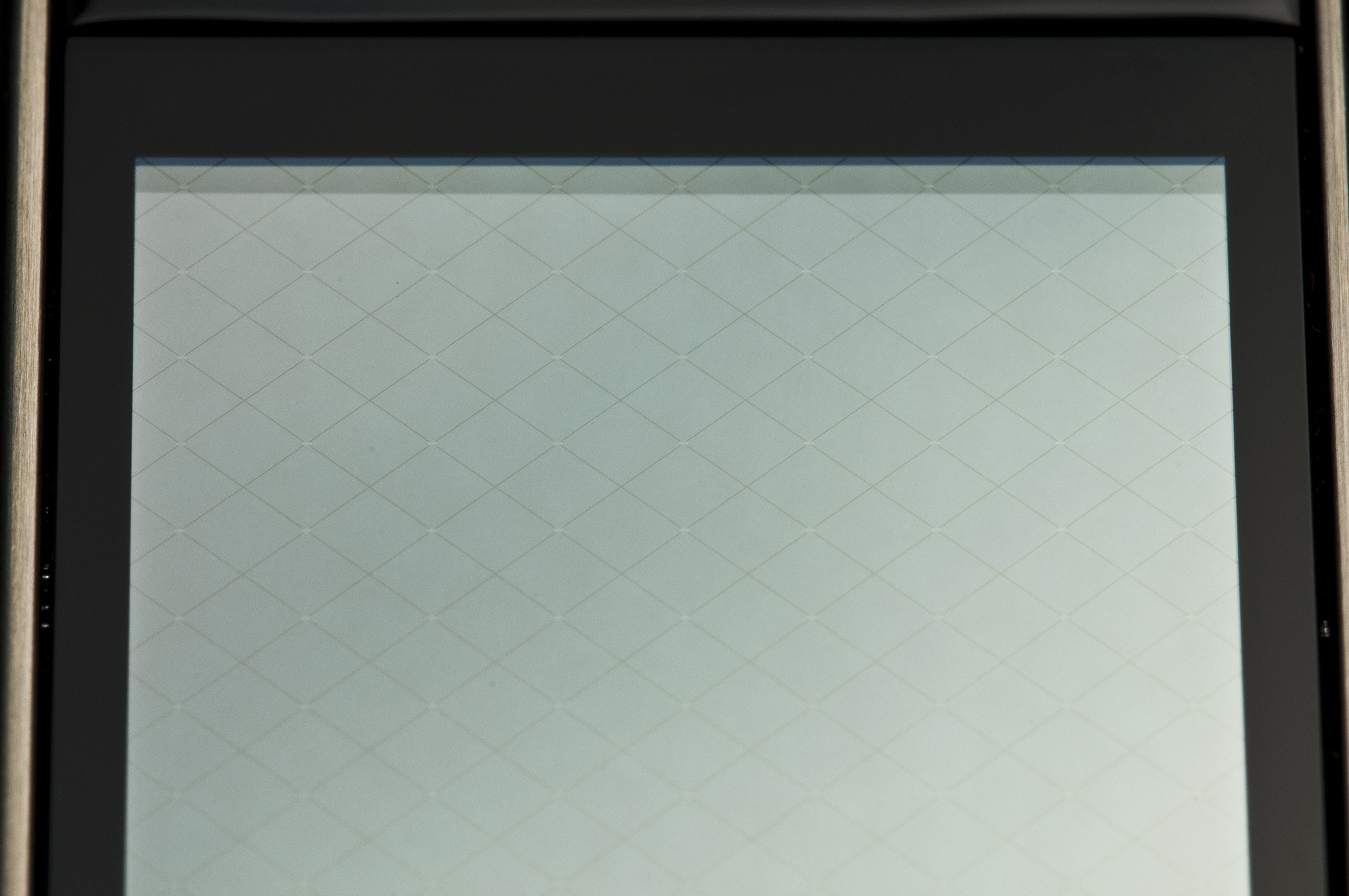
Capacitive touchscreen of a mobile phone

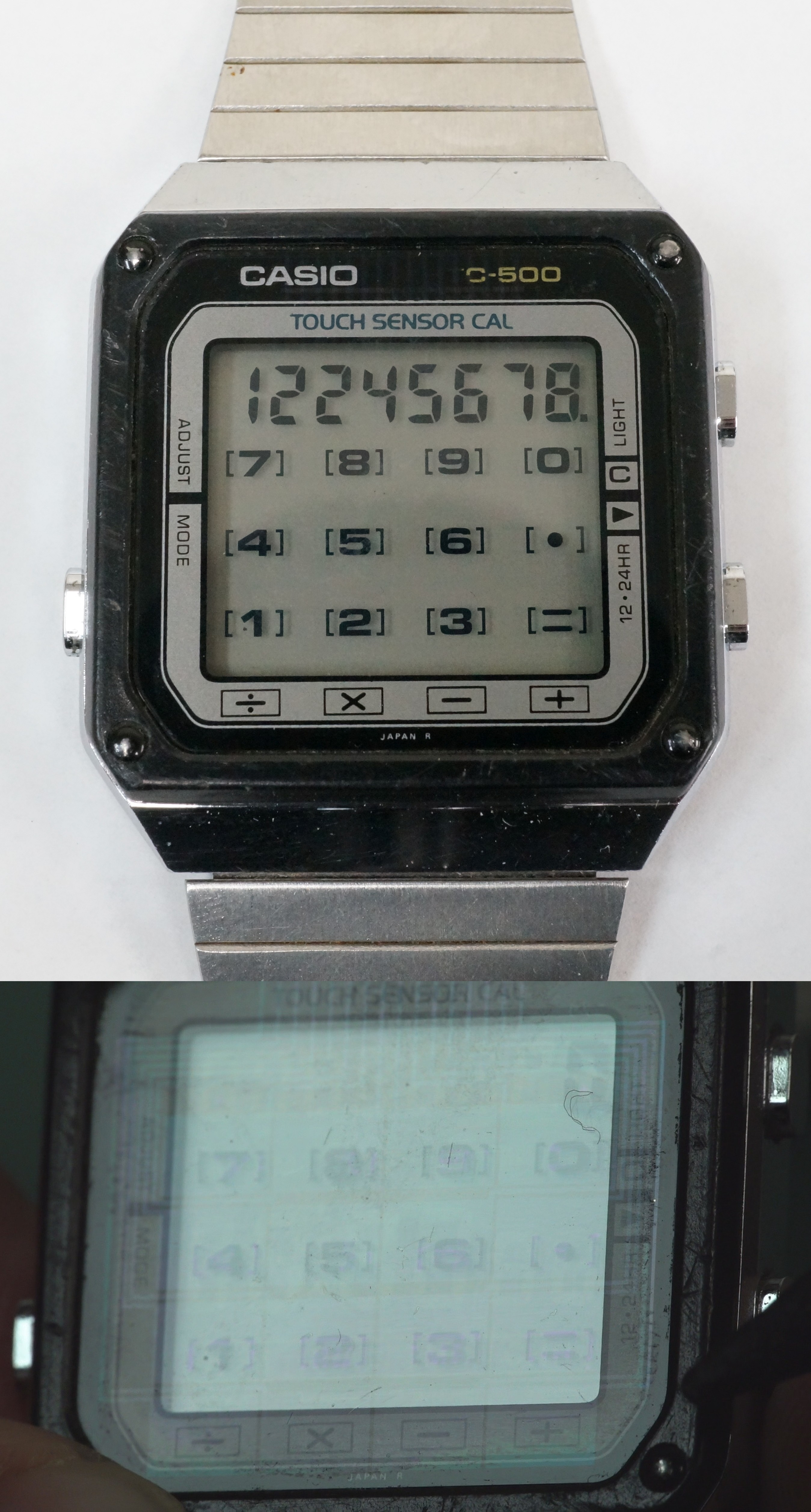
The Casio TC500 Capacitive touch sensor watch from 1983, with angled light exposing the touch sensor pads and traces etched onto the top watch glass surface

A capacitive touchscreen panel consists of an insulator, such as glass, coated with a transparent conductor, such as indium tin oxide (ITO). As the human body is also an electrical conductor, touching the surface of the screen results in a distortion of the screen's electrostatic field, measurable as a change in capacitance. Different technologies may be used to determine the location of the touch. The location is then sent to the controller for processing. Some touchscreens use silver instead of ITO, as ITO causes several environmental problems due to the use of indium. The controller is typically a complementary metal–oxide–semiconductor (CMOS) application-specific integrated circuit (ASIC) chip, which in turn usually sends the signals to a CMOS digital signal processor (DSP) for processing.

Unlike a resistive touchscreen, some capacitive touchscreens cannot be used to detect a finger through electrically insulating material, such as gloves. This disadvantage especially affects usability in consumer electronics, such as touch tablet PCs and capacitive smartphones in cold weather when people may be wearing gloves. It can be overcome with a special capacitive stylus, or a special-application glove with an embroidered patch of conductive thread allowing electrical contact with the user's fingertip.

A low-quality switching-mode power supply unit with an accordingly unstable, noisy voltage may temporarily interfere with the precision, accuracy and sensitivity of capacitive touch screens.

Projected capacitive touchscreens can detect a finger which is near the screen without necessarily touching it. This allows for more accurate measurements, multi-touch support, and allows sensing through light gloves.

Some capacitive display manufacturers continue to develop thinner and more accurate touchscreens. Those for mobile devices are now being produced with 'in-cell' technology, such as in Samsung's Super AMOLED screens, that eliminates a layer by building the capacitors inside the display itself. This type of touchscreen reduces the visible distance between the user's finger and what the user is touching on the screen, reducing the thickness and weight of the display, which is desirable in smartphones.

A simple parallel-plate capacitor has two conductors separated by a dielectric layer. Most of the energy in this system is concentrated directly between the plates. Some of the energy spills over into the area outside the plates, and the electric field lines associated with this effect are called fringing fields. Part of the challenge of making a practical capacitive sensor is to design a set of printed circuit traces which direct fringing fields into an active sensing area accessible to a user. A parallel-plate capacitor is not a good choice for such a sensor pattern. Placing a finger near fringing electric fields adds conductive surface area to the capacitive system. The additional charge storage capacity added by the finger is known as finger capacitance, or CF. The capacitance of the sensor without a finger present is known as parasitic capacitance, or CP.

==== Surface capacitance ====
In this basic technology, only one side of the insulator is coated with a conductive layer. A small voltage is applied to the layer, resulting in a uniform electrostatic field. When a conductor, such as a human finger, touches the uncoated surface, a capacitor is dynamically formed. The sensor's controller can determine the location of the touch indirectly from the change in the capacitance as measured from the four corners of the panel. As it has no moving parts, it is moderately durable but has limited resolution, is prone to false signals from parasitic capacitive coupling, and needs calibration during manufacture. It is therefore most often used in simple applications such as industrial controls and kiosks.

Although some standard capacitance detection methods are projective, in the sense that they can be used to detect a finger through a non-conductive surface, they are very sensitive to fluctuations in temperature, which expand or contract the sensing plates, causing fluctuations in the capacitance of these plates. These fluctuations result in a lot of background noise, so a strong finger signal is required for accurate detection. This limits applications to those where the finger directly touches the sensing element or is sensed through a relatively thin non-conductive surface.

==== Mutual capacitance ====
An electrical signal, imposed on one electrical conductor, can be capacitively "sensed" by another electrical conductor that is in very close proximity, but electrically isolated—a feature that is exploited in mutual capacitance touchscreens. In a mutual capacitive sensor array, the "mutual" crossing of one electrical conductor with another electrical conductor, but with no direct electrical contact, forms a capacitor (see touchscreen#Construction).

High frequency voltage pulses are applied to these conductors, one at a time. These pulses capacitively couple to every conductor that intersects it.

Bringing a finger or conductive stylus close to the surface of the sensor changes the local electrostatic field, which in turn reduces the capacitance between these intersecting conductors. Any significant change in the strength of the signal sensed is used to determine if a finger is present or not at an intersection.

The capacitance change at every intersection on the grid can be measured to accurately determine one or more touch locations.

Mutual capacitance allows multi-touch operation where multiple fingers, palms or styli can be accurately tracked at the same time.The greater the number of intersections, the better the touch resolution and the more independent fingers that can be detected. This indicates a distinct advantage of diagonal wiring over standard x/y wiring, since diagonal wiring creates nearly twice the number of intersections.

A 30 i/o, 16×14 x/y array, for example, would have 224 of these intersections / capacitors, and a 30 i/o diagonal lattice array could have 435 intersections.

Each trace of an x/y mutual capacitance array only has one function, it is either an input or an output. The horizontal traces may be transmitters while the vertical traces are sensors, or vice versa.

==== Self-capacitance ====
Self-capacitance sensors can have the same layout as mutual capacitance sensors, but, with self-capacitance all the traces usually operate independently, with no interaction between different traces. Along with several other methods, the extra capacitive load of a finger on a trace electrode may be measured by a current meter, or by the change in frequency of an RC oscillator.

Traces are sensed, one after the other until all the traces have been sensed. A finger may be detected anywhere along the whole length of a trace (even "off-screen"), but there is no indication where the finger is along that trace. If, however, a finger is also detected along another intersecting trace, then it is assumed that the finger position is at the intersection of the two traces. This allows for the speedy and accurate detection of a single finger.

Although mutual capacitance is simpler for multi-touch, multi-touch can be achieved using self-capacitance.

Self-capacitive touch screen layers are used on mobile phones such as the Sony Xperia Sola, the Samsung Galaxy S4, Galaxy Note 3, Galaxy S5, and Galaxy Alpha.

Self-capacitance is far more sensitive than mutual capacitance and is mainly used for single touch, simple gesturing and proximity sensing where the finger does not even have to touch the glass surface. Mutual capacitance is mainly used for multitouch applications. Many touchscreen manufacturers use both self and mutual capacitance technologies in the same product, thereby combining their individual benefits.

==== Use of stylus on capacitive screens ====
Capacitive touchscreens do not necessarily need to be operated by a finger, but until recently the special styli required could be quite expensive to purchase. The cost of this technology has fallen greatly in recent years and capacitive styli are now widely available for a nominal charge, and often given away free with mobile accessories. These consist of an electrically conductive shaft with a soft conductive rubber tip, thereby resistively connecting the fingers to the tip of the stylus.

==== Fingerprint sensing ====
Capacitive touchscreen technology can be used for ultra-high resolution sensing, such as fingerprint sensing. Fingerprint sensors require a micro-capacitor spacing of about 44 to 50 microns.

=== Infrared grid ===
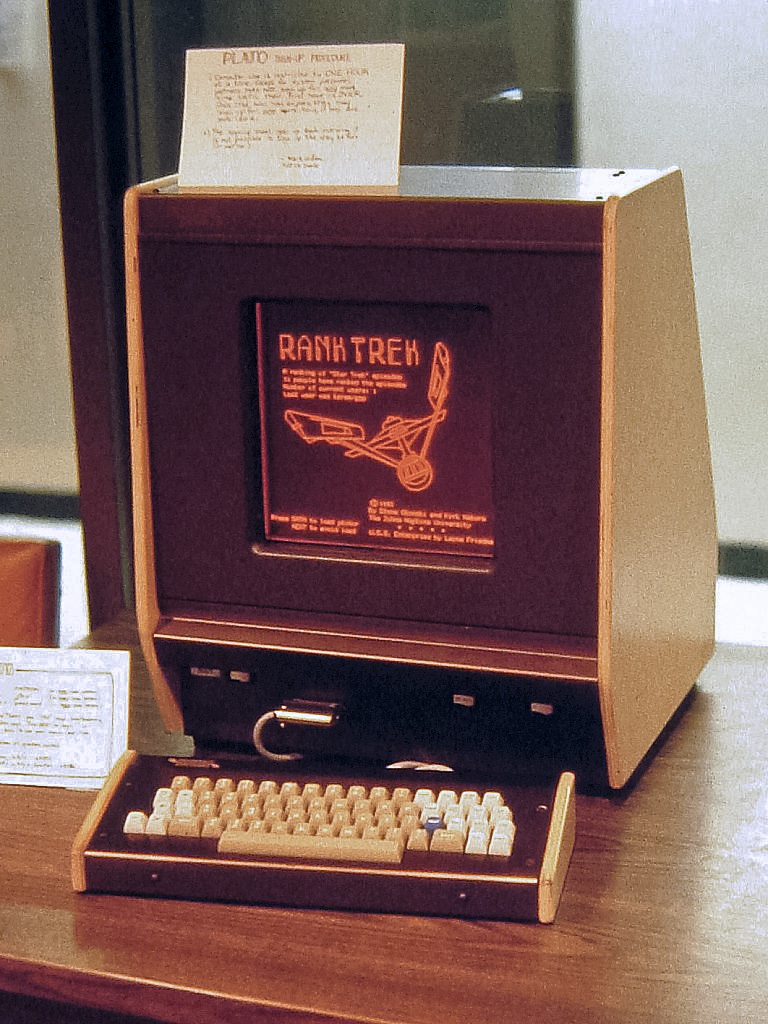
Infrared sensors mounted around the display watch for a user's touchscreen input on this PLATO V terminal in 1981. The monochromatic plasma display's characteristic orange glow is illustrated.

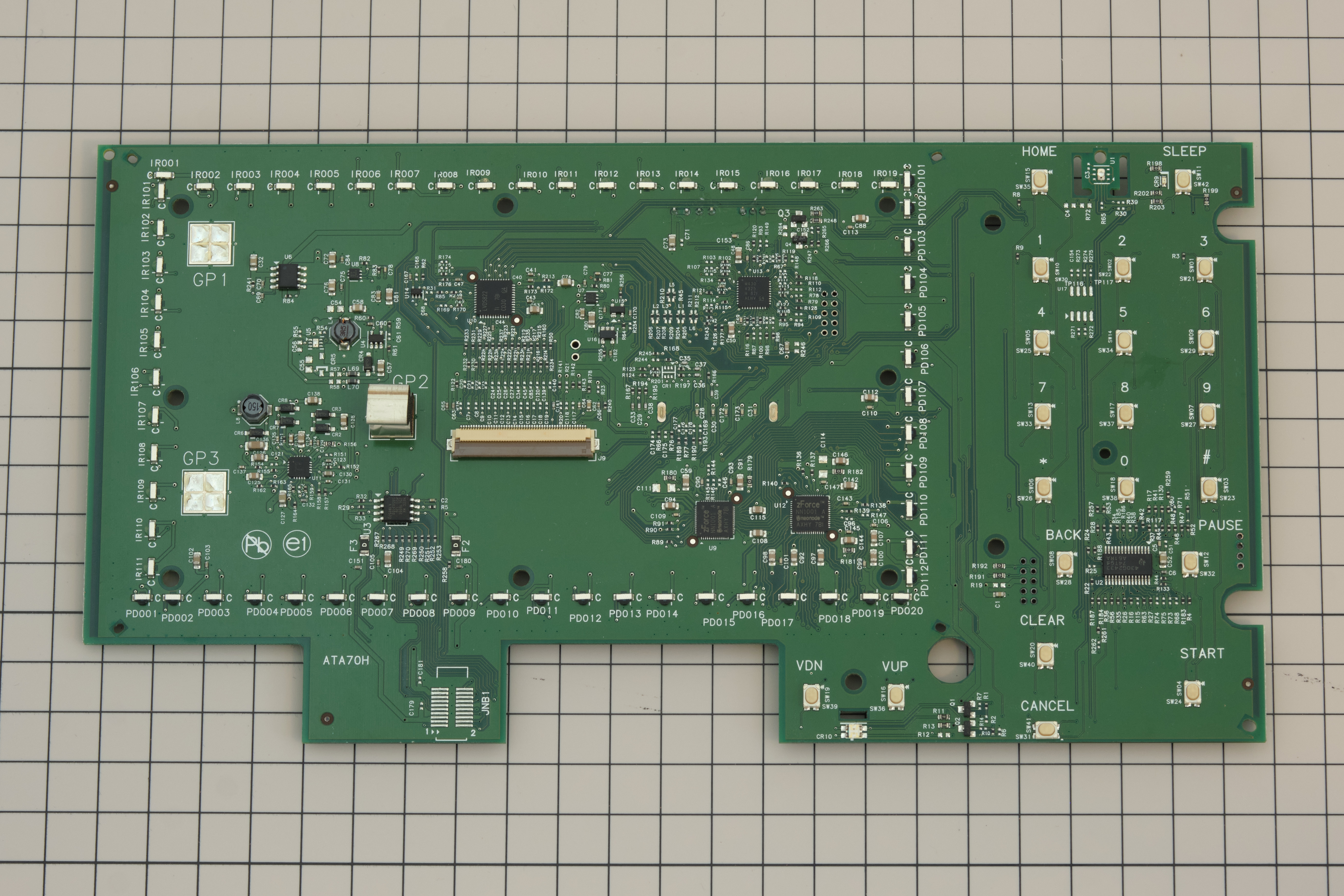
Printed circuit board from a control panel of a device using an infrared touchscreen, showing the arrays of infrared LEDs and photodiodes used to detect touches

An infrared touchscreen uses an array of X-Y infrared LED and photodetector pairs around the edges of the screen to detect a disruption in the pattern of LED beams. These LED beams cross each other in vertical and horizontal patterns. This helps the sensors pick up the exact location of the touch. A major benefit of such a system is that it can detect essentially any opaque object including a finger, gloved finger, stylus or pen. It is generally used in outdoor applications and POS systems that cannot rely on a conductor (such as a bare finger) to activate the touchscreen. Unlike capacitive touchscreens, infrared touchscreens do not require any patterning on the glass which increases durability and optical clarity of the overall system. Infrared touchscreens are sensitive to dirt and dust that can interfere with the infrared beams, and suffer from parallax in curved surfaces and accidental press when the user hovers a finger over the screen while searching for the item to be selected.

=== Infrared acrylic projection ===
A translucent acrylic sheet is used as a rear-projection screen to display information. The edges of the acrylic sheet are illuminated by infrared LEDs, and infrared cameras are focused on the back of the sheet. Objects placed on the sheet are detectable by the cameras. When the sheet is touched by the user, frustrated total internal reflection results in leakage of infrared light which peaks at the points of maximum pressure, indicating the user's touch location. Microsoft's PixelSense tablets used this technology.

=== Optical imaging ===
Optical touchscreens are a relatively modern development in touchscreen technology, in which two or more image sensors (such as CMOS sensors) are placed around the edges (mostly the corners) of the screen. Infrared backlights are placed in the sensor's field of view on the opposite side of the screen. A touch blocks some lights from the sensors, and the location and size of the touching object can be calculated (see visual hull). This technology is growing in popularity due to its scalability, versatility, and affordability for larger touchscreens.

=== Dispersive signal technology ===
Introduced in 2002 by 3M, this system detects a touch by measuring the piezoelectric effect — the voltage generated when mechanical force is applied to a material — that occurs when a glass substrate is touched. Complex algorithms interpret this information and provide the actual location of the touch. The technology is unaffected by dust and other outside elements, including scratches. Since there is no need for additional elements on screen, it also claims to provide excellent optical clarity. Any object can be used to generate touch events, including gloved fingers. A downside is that after the initial touch, the system cannot detect a motionless finger. However, for the same reason, resting objects do not disrupt touch recognition.

=== Acoustic pulse recognition ===
The key to this technology is that a touch at any one position on the surface generates a sound wave in the substrate which then produces a unique combined signal as measured by three or more tiny transducers attached to the edges of the touchscreen. The digitized signal is compared to a list corresponding to every position on the surface, determining the touch location. A moving touch is tracked by rapid repetition of this process. Extraneous and ambient sounds are ignored since they do not match any stored sound profile. The technology differs from other sound-based technologies by using a simple look-up method rather than expensive signal-processing hardware. As with the dispersive signal technology system, a motionless finger cannot be detected after the initial touch. However, for the same reason, the touch recognition is not disrupted by any resting objects. The technology was created by SoundTouch Ltd in the early 2000s, as described by the patent family EP1852772, and introduced to the market by Tyco International's Elo division in 2006 as Acoustic Pulse Recognition. The touchscreen used by Elo is made of ordinary glass, giving good durability and optical clarity. The technology usually retains accuracy with scratches and dust on the screen. The technology is also well suited to displays that are physically larger.

== Development ==
The development of multi-touch screens facilitated the tracking of more than one finger on the screen; thus, operations that require more than one finger are possible. These devices also allow multiple users to interact with the touchscreen simultaneously.

With the growing use of touchscreens, the cost of touchscreen technology is routinely absorbed into the products that incorporate it and is nearly eliminated. Touchscreen technology has demonstrated reliability and is found in airplanes, automobiles, gaming consoles, machine control systems, appliances, and handheld display devices including cellphones; the touchscreen market for mobile devices was projected to produce US$5 billion by 2009.

The ability to accurately point on the screen itself is also advancing with the emerging graphics tablet-screen hybrids. Polyvinylidene fluoride (PVDF) plays a major role in this innovation due its high piezoelectric properties, which allow the tablet to sense pressure, making such things as digital painting behave more like paper and pencil.

TapSense, announced in October 2011, allows touchscreens to distinguish what part of the hand was used for input, such as the fingertip, knuckle and fingernail. This could be used in a variety of ways, for example, to copy and paste, to capitalize letters, to activate different drawing modes, etc.

== Ergonomics and usage ==
=== Touchscreen enable ===
For touchscreens to be effective input devices, users must be able to accurately select targets and avoid accidental selection of adjacent targets. The design of touchscreen interfaces should reflect technical capabilities of the system, ergonomics, cognitive psychology and human physiology.

Guidelines for touchscreen designs were first developed in the 2000s, based on early research and actual use of older systems, typically using infrared grids—which were highly dependent on the size of the user's fingers. These guidelines are less relevant for the bulk of modern touch devices which use capacitive or resistive touch technology.

From the mid-2000s, makers of operating systems for smartphones have promulgated standards, but these vary between manufacturers, and allow for significant variation in size based on technology changes, so are unsuitable from a human factors perspective.

Much more important is the accuracy humans have in selecting targets with their finger or a pen stylus. The accuracy of user selection varies by position on the screen: users are most accurate at the center, less so at the left and right edges, and least accurate at the top edge and especially the bottom edge. The R95 accuracy (required radius for 95% target accuracy) varies from 7 mm (0.28 in) in the center to 12 mm (0.47 in) in the lower corners. Users are subconsciously aware of this, and take more time to select targets which are smaller or at the edges or corners of the touchscreen.

This user inaccuracy is a result of parallax, visual acuity and the speed of the feedback loop between the eyes and fingers. The precision of the human finger alone is much, much higher than this, so when assistive technologies are provided—such as on-screen magnifiers—users can move their finger (once in contact with the screen) with precision as small as 0.1 mm (0.004 in).

=== Hand position, digit used and switching ===
Users of handheld and portable touchscreen devices hold them in a variety of ways, and routinely change their method of holding and selection to suit the position and type of input. There are four basic types of handheld interaction:

- Holding at least in part with both hands, tapping with a single thumb
- Holding with two hands and tapping with both thumbs
- Holding with one hand, tapping with the finger (or rarely, thumb) of another hand
- Holding the device in one hand, and tapping with the thumb from that same hand

Use rates vary widely. While two-thumb tapping is encountered rarely (1–3%) for many general interactions, it is used for 41% of typing interaction.

In addition, devices are often placed on surfaces (desks or tables) and tablets especially are used in stands. The user may point, select or gesture in these cases with their finger or thumb, and vary use of these methods.

=== Combined with haptics ===
Touchscreens are often used with haptic response systems. A common example of this technology is the vibratory feedback provided when a button on the touchscreen is tapped. Haptics are used to improve the user's experience with touchscreens by providing simulated tactile feedback, and can be designed to react immediately, partly countering on-screen response latency. Research from the University of Glasgow (Brewster, Chohan, and Brown, 2007; and more recently Hogan) demonstrates that touchscreen users reduce input errors (by 20%), increase input speed (by 20%), and lower their cognitive load (by 40%) when touchscreens are combined with haptics or tactile feedback. On top of this, a study conducted in 2013 by Boston College explored the effects that touchscreens haptic stimulation had on triggering psychological ownership of a product. Their research concluded that a touchscreens ability to incorporate high amounts of haptic involvement resulted in customers feeling more endowment to the products they were designing or buying. The study also reported that consumers using a touchscreen were willing to accept a higher price point for the items they were purchasing.

=== Customer service ===
Touchscreen technology has become integrated into many aspects of customer service industry in the 21st century. The restaurant industry is a good example of touchscreen implementation into this domain. Chain restaurants such as Taco Bell, Panera Bread, and McDonald's offer touchscreens as an option when customers are ordering items off the menu. While the addition of touchscreens is a development for this industry, customers may choose to bypass the touchscreen and order from a traditional cashier. To take this a step further, a restaurant in Bangalore has attempted to completely automate the ordering process. Customers sit down to a table embedded with touchscreens and order off an extensive menu. Once the order is placed it is sent electronically to the kitchen. These types of touchscreens fit under the Point of Sale (POS) systems mentioned in the lead section.

=== "Gorilla arm" ===
Extended use of gestural interfaces without the ability of the user to rest their arm is referred to as "gorilla arm". It can result in fatigue, and even repetitive stress injury when routinely used in a work setting. Certain early pen-based interfaces required the operator to work in this position for much of the workday. Allowing the user to rest their hand or arm on the input device or a frame around it is a solution for this in many contexts. This phenomenon is often cited as an example of movements to be minimized by proper ergonomic design.

Unsupported touchscreens are still fairly common in applications such as ATMs and data kiosks, but are not an issue as the typical user only engages for brief and widely spaced periods.

=== Fingerprints ===
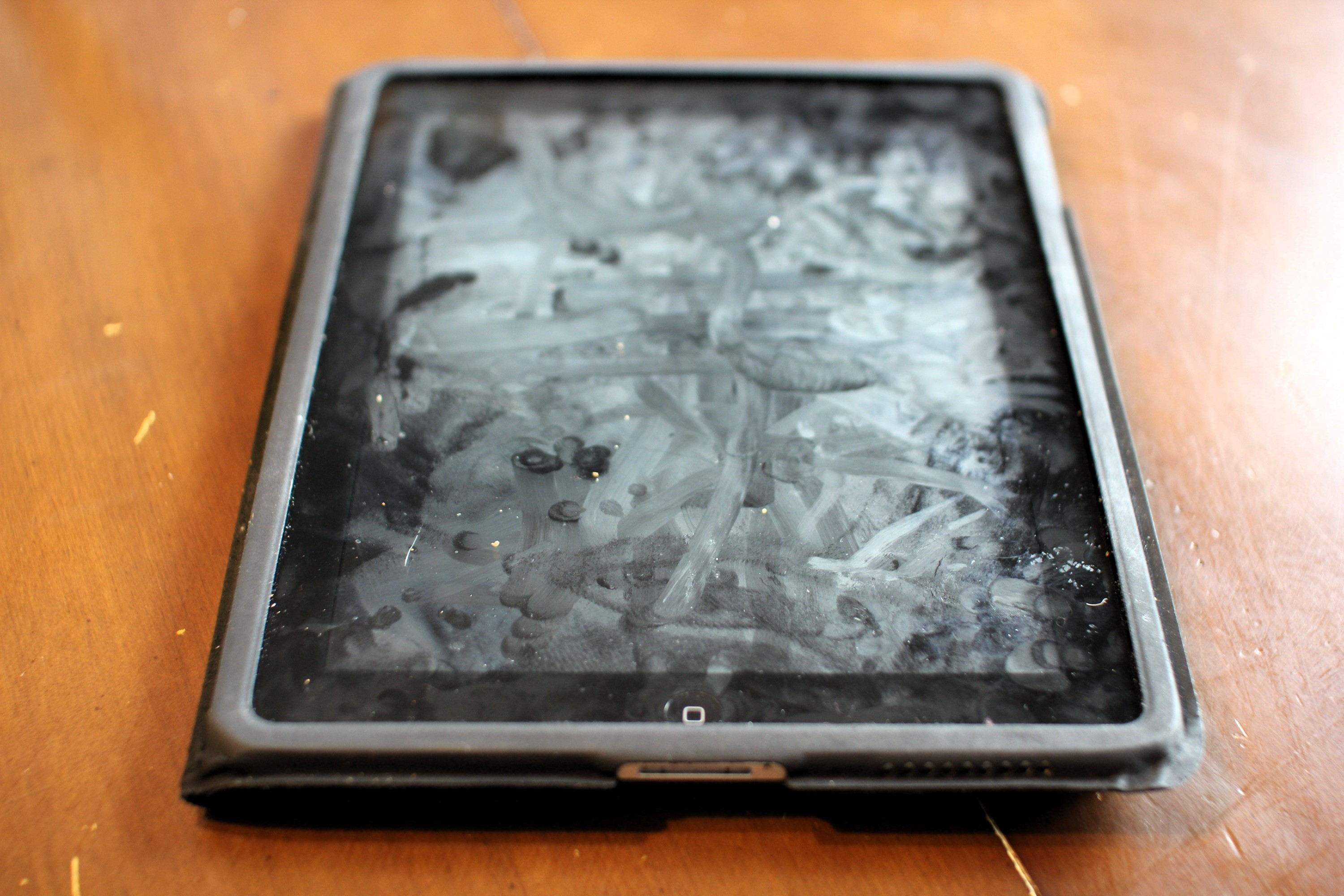
Fingerprints and smudges on an iPad (tablet computer) touchscreen used by children

Touchscreens can suffer from the problem of fingerprints on the display. This can be mitigated by the use of materials with optical coatings designed to reduce the visible effects of fingerprint oils. Most modern smartphones have oleophobic coatings, which lessen the amount of oil residue. Another option is to install a matte-finish anti-glare screen protector, which creates a slightly roughened surface that does not easily retain smudges.

=== Glove touch ===
Capacitive touchscreens rarely work when the user wears gloves. The thickness of the glove and the material they are made of play a significant role on that and the ability of a touchscreen to pick up a touch.

Some devices have a mode which increases the sensitivity of the touchscreen. This allows the touchscreen to be used more reliably with gloves, but can also result in unreliable and phantom inputs. However, thin gloves such as medical gloves are thin enough for users to wear when using touchscreens; mostly applicable to medical technology and machines.

== See also ==
- Charlieplexing – Technique for driving a multiplexed display
- Dual-touchscreen – Digital display setup
- Energy harvesting – Collecting energy from external sources
- Flexible keyboard – Hardware technology of keyboards
- Gestural interface – Input technology in computer science
- Graphics tablet – Computer input device
- Interactive whiteboard – Large interactive display
- Light pen – Computer input device
- List of touch-solution manufacturers
- Lock screen – Computer user interface element
- Multi-touch – Touchscreen interactions using multiple fingers
- Nintendo DS – Handheld game console
- OmniTouch – Wearable computer user interface
- One Glass Solution – Touchscreen technology
- Pen computing – Uses a stylus and tablet/touchscreen
- Pointing device gesture – Computer input method
- Sensacell – Touchscreen display technology
- SixthSense – Gesture-based wearable computer system
- Tablet computer – Mobile computer with integrated display, circuitry, and battery
- Touch switch – Electrical switch which is activated by being touched
- Touchscreen remote control – Type of device used to control other devices remotely
