= Bent Stumpe =

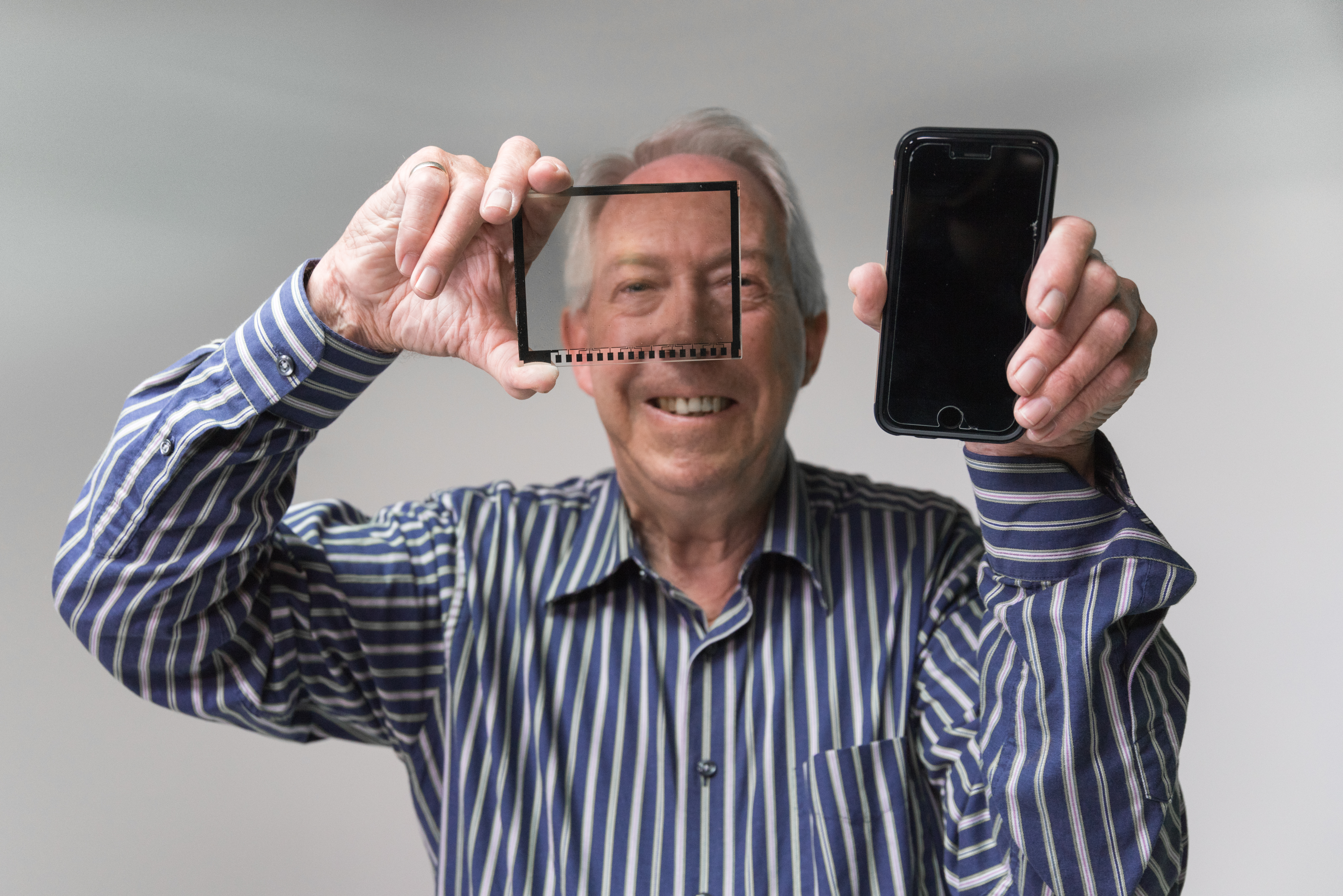
- Bent Stumpe showing a prototype of a capacitive touchscreen developed at CERN in the 1970’s.—a similar technology to which was applied to the iPhone produced by Apple Inc. many years later.
- Born: 12 September 1938 (age 87); Copenhagen, Denmark
- Education: Royal Danish Air Force
- Occupation: Electronic engineer
- Known for: Early development of the touchscreen

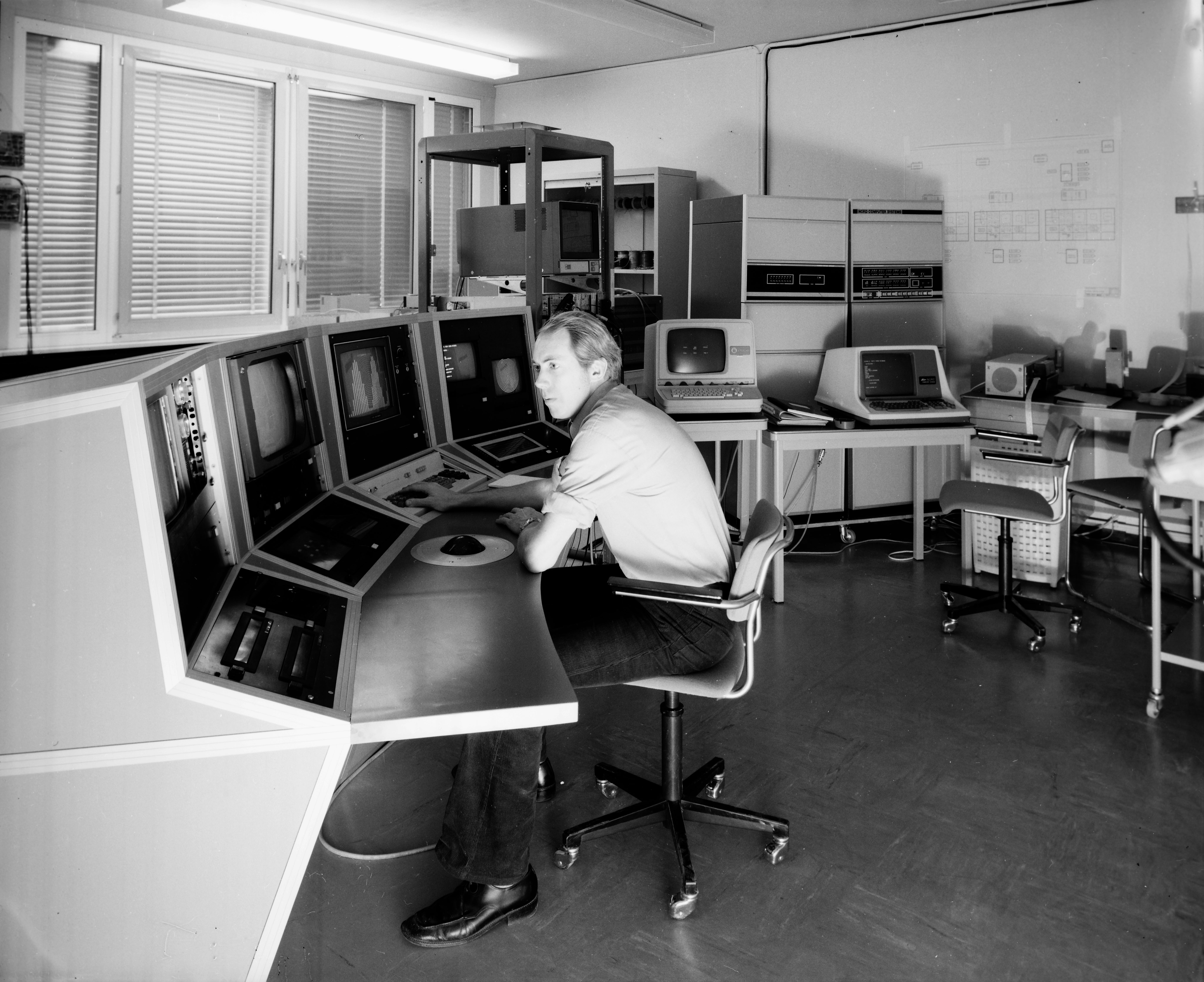
Bent Stumpe in front of the prototype of the SPS console, 1973

Bent Stumpe (born 12 September 1938) is a Danish electronic engineer who spent most of his career at the international research laboratory CERN, Geneva, Switzerland. Stumpe built in 1972, following an idea launched by Frank Beck, a capacitive touchscreen for controlling CERN's Super Proton Synchrotron accelerator. In 1973 Beck and Stumpe published a CERN report, outlining the concept for a prototype touchscreen as well as a multi-function computer-configurable knob.

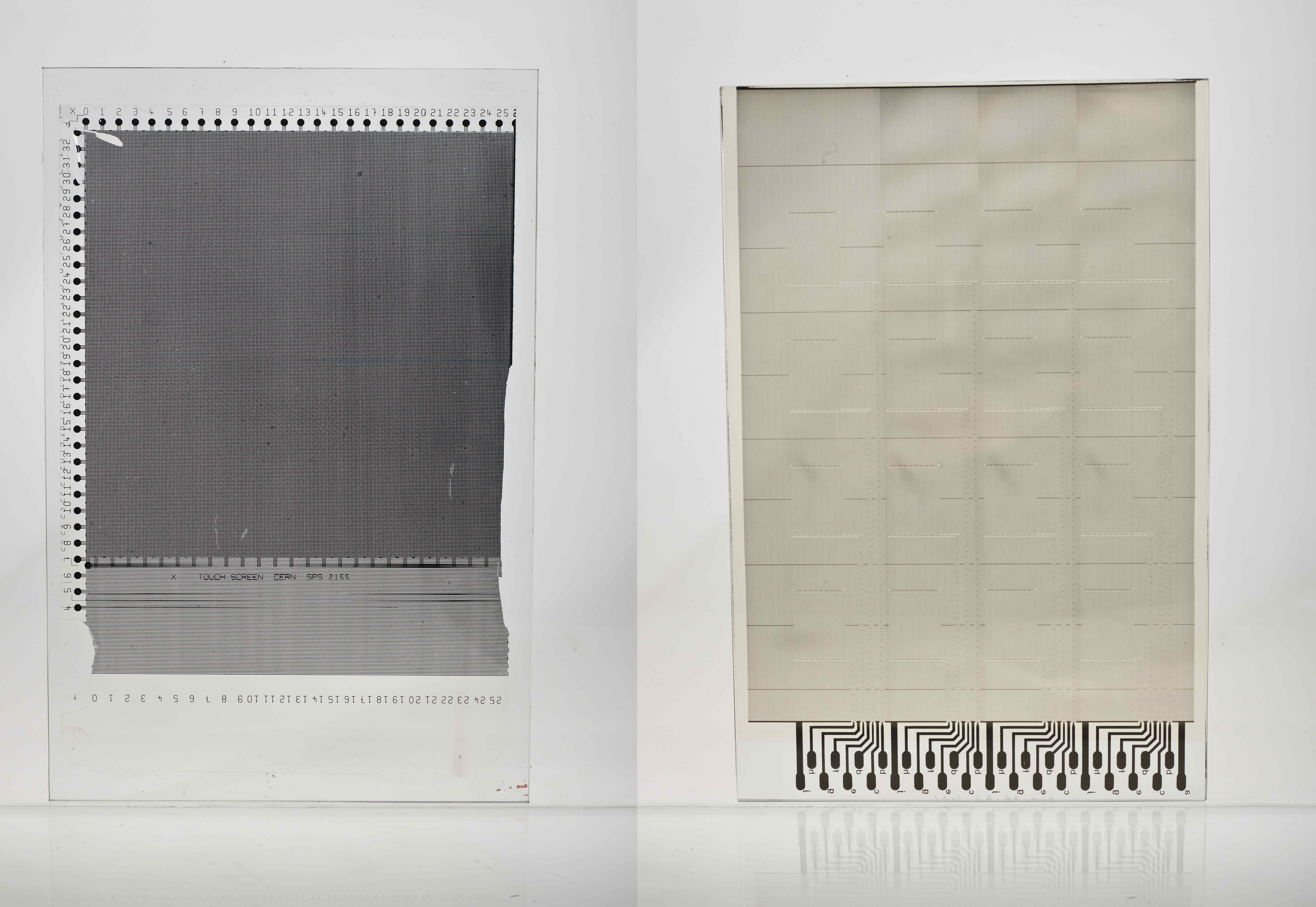
On the left, x-y multi touch capacitance screen prototype developed at CERN in 1977; on the right, self capacitance screen developed at CERN in 1972.

== Education ==
Bent Stumpe was educated within the Royal Danish Air Force and obtained a certificate as a radio/radar engineer in 1959.

== Career ==
Leaving the Air Force, Stumpe was employed from 1959 to 1961 at the Danish radio and television factory TO-R Radio before he was employed by CERN from 1961 until 2003. In combination with his activities at CERN, Stumpe was a consultant to the World Health Organization working on the development of an instrument for the early detection of Leprosy.
