= Frank Beck (computer scientist) =

British computer scientist (1930–2020)

Frank Beck (28 December 1930 – 3 February 2020) was a British computer scientist who pioneered the application of user-interface hardware including the touchscreen, the computer-controlled knob and the video wall while working at CERN during the 1970s.

== Early life ==
He was born as Franz Beck in Vienna, Austria to Friedrich and Edith Beck, a Jewish couple who worked in a family-owned business. At the age of 8, shortly before the outbreak of World War II he escaped to London, England with his mother. His father stayed behind, escaping to France, where he survived for three years before being sent to Auschwitz and murdered. On arrival in England, Franz anglicized his name to Frank, and, like thousands of other children, was evacuated from London during hostilities.

After leaving school, he was conscripted into the Royal Air Force where he worked as a wireless mechanic, and learned about electronics. When his National Service ended he worked at the GEC research labs while studying mathematics at Chelsea Polytechnic (now King's College) and Birkbeck College. At this time he became interested in the emerging science of computer programming, and became a programmer on his employer's HEC computer, a commercially available machine. He then moved to the Central Electricity Generating Board where he did engineering calculations on their English Electric DEUCE computer. In 1958 he married Margaret Louise Hammel (1934–2003, known as Louise). Frank and Louise's sons Simon and Stephen were born in 1961 and 1962.

== CERN, Argonne and the Fermilab ==
In 1962, he was invited to apply for a position as a mathematician at CERN in Geneva, Switzerland, and the family moved there. In 1967 Beck was invited to work at the Argonne National Laboratory near Chicago in the United States, and the family moved to La Grange, Illinois . At Argonne Beck did some pioneering work on pattern recognition devices for bubble-chamber photographs. The machines for doing this involved interactive human interfaces.

Activity at CERN in the meantime focussed on the construction of the Super Proton Synchrotron (SPS), and in 1972 Beck was invited back to Europe to design and build the SPS control room and its hardware and software in the environment of a revolutionary multicomputer control system being constructed by a group under Michael Crowley-Milling. In 1973 he published a CERN document, along with his colleague Bent Stumpe, outlining the concept for a prototype touchscreen as well as a multi-function computer-configurable knob, both of which found their way onto the consoles of the finished control room. The CERN touchscreen was arguably the first practical device of its kind and used a matrix of transparent capacitative pads above a cathode-ray tube.

Beck began post-graduate studies at the Université Louis-Pasteur in Strasbourg, France. His doctoral thesis, presented in 1976, was an expanded version of the 1973 CERN paper, this time also describing the control philosophy, which allowed skilled operators to design their own interface methods, and the various devices (including the knob and the touchscreen, the video wall, and a switchable pool of display devices). In 1983 he moved back to Illinois for two years, this time to work at the Fermilab in Batavia before returning once more to CERN to work on the Aleph detector.

== Later life and retirement ==
He retired in the early 1990s and he and Louise returned to London. Frank had two sons and four grandchildren. He died of natural causes on 3 February 2020, aged 89.
