= Preset =

Preset may refer to:

- Default (computer science), a setting or value automatically assigned to a software application, computer program, etc.
- Preset (electronics), a variable component on a device only accessible to manufacturing or maintenance personnel
- Pre-programmed setting on various electronic products and musical instruments, including:
  - Combination action on pipe organ
  - Preset button (tuner), station selectors on the tuner of radio receiver and television set
  - Preset key (Hammond organ), inverse color keys on Hammond organs, to recall pre-programmed tonewheel settings
  - Preset rhythm, pre-programmed rhythm-pattern on drum machine
  - Synthesizer patch stored a pre-programmed tone

== Mathematics ==
- Pre-ordered set

== Music ==
- The Presets, a Sydney-based Australian duo, consisting of Julian Hamilton and Kim Moyes

== Schools ==
- Preset Pacesetters Institute, a private boarding Senior High school in Madina, Ghana
