= Transducer =

Device that converts energy from one form to another

A transducer is a device that usefully converts energy from one form to another. Usually a transducer converts a signal in one form of energy to a signal in another. Transducers are often employed at the boundaries of automation, measurement, and control systems, where electrical signals are converted to and from other physical quantities (energy, force, torque, light, motion, position, etc.). The process of converting one form of energy to another is known as transduction.

== Types ==
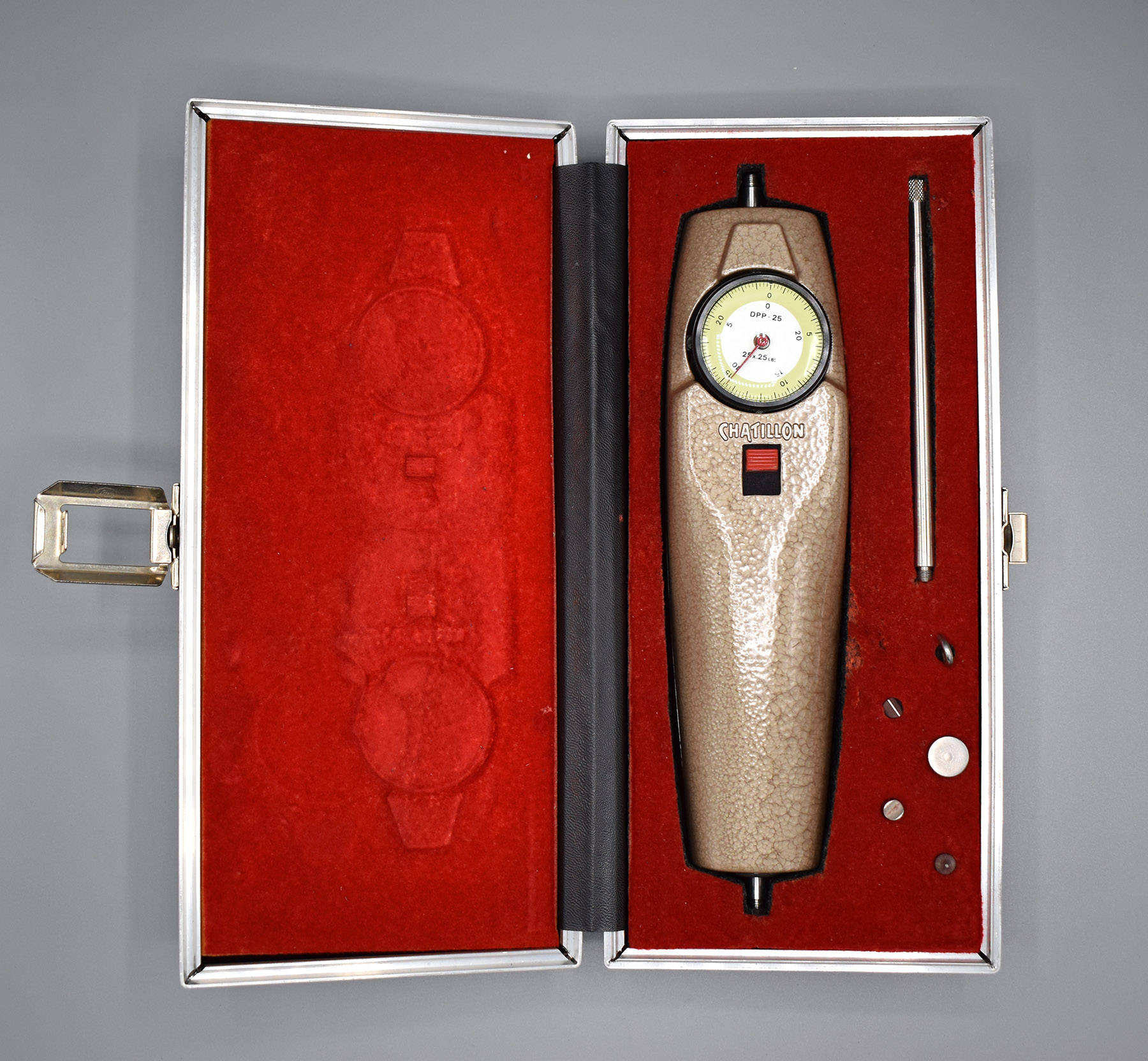
Mechanical transducer

- Mechanical transducers convert physical quantities into mechanical outputs or vice versa;
- Electrical transducers convert physical quantities into electrical outputs or signals. Examples of these are:
  - a thermocouple that changes temperature differences into a small voltage;
  - a linear variable differential transformer (LVDT), used to measure displacement (position) changes by means of electrical signals.

== Sensors, actuators and transceivers ==
Transducers can be categorized by the direction information passes through them:

- A sensor is a transducer that receives and responds to a signal or stimulus from a physical system. It produces a signal, which represents information about the system, which is used by some type of telemetry, information or control system.
- An actuator is a device that is responsible for moving or controlling a mechanism or system. It is controlled by a signal from a control system or manual control. It is operated by a source of energy, which can be mechanical force, electrical current, hydraulic fluid pressure, or pneumatic pressure, and converts that energy into motion. An actuator is the mechanism by which a control system acts upon an environment. The control system can be simple (a fixed mechanical or electrical system), software-based (e.g. a printer driver, robot control system), a human, or any other input.
- Bidirectional transducers can convert physical phenomena to electrical signals and electrical signals into physical phenomena. An example of an inherently bidirectional transducer is an antenna, which can convert radio waves (electromagnetic waves) into an electrical signal to be processed by a radio receiver, or translate an electrical signal from a transmitter into radio waves. Another example is a voice coil, which is used in loudspeakers to translate an electrical audio signal into sound, and in dynamic microphones to translate sound waves into an audio signal.
- Transceivers integrate simultaneous bidirectional functionality. The most ubiquitous example are likely radio transceivers (such as transponders in aircraft), used in virtually every form of wireless (tele-)communications and network device connections. Another example is ultrasonic transceivers that are used for instance in medical ultrasound (echo) scans.

=== Active vs passive transducers ===
Passive transducers require an external power source to operate, which is called an excitation signal. The signal is modulated by the sensor to produce an output signal. For example, a thermistor does not generate any electrical signal, but by passing an electric current through it, its resistance can be measured by detecting variations in the current or voltage across the thermistor.

Active transducers in contrast, generate electric current in response to an external stimulus which serves as the output signal without the need of an additional energy source. Such examples are a photodiode, and a piezoelectric sensor, photovoltaic, thermocouple.

== Characteristics ==
Some specifications that are used to rate transducers:

- Dynamic range: This is the ratio between the largest amplitude signal and the smallest amplitude signal the transducer can effectively translate. Transducers with larger dynamic range are more "sensitive" and precise.
- Repeatability: This is the ability of the transducer to produce an identical output when stimulated by the same input.
- Noise: All transducers add some random noise to their output. In electrical transducers this may be electrical noise due to thermal motion of charges in circuits. Noise corrupts small signals more than large ones.
- Hysteresis: This is a property in which the output of the transducer depends not only on its current input but its past input. For example, an actuator which uses a gear train may have some backlash, which means that if the direction of motion of the actuator reverses, there will be a dead zone before the output of the actuator reverses, caused by play between the gear teeth.

== Applications ==
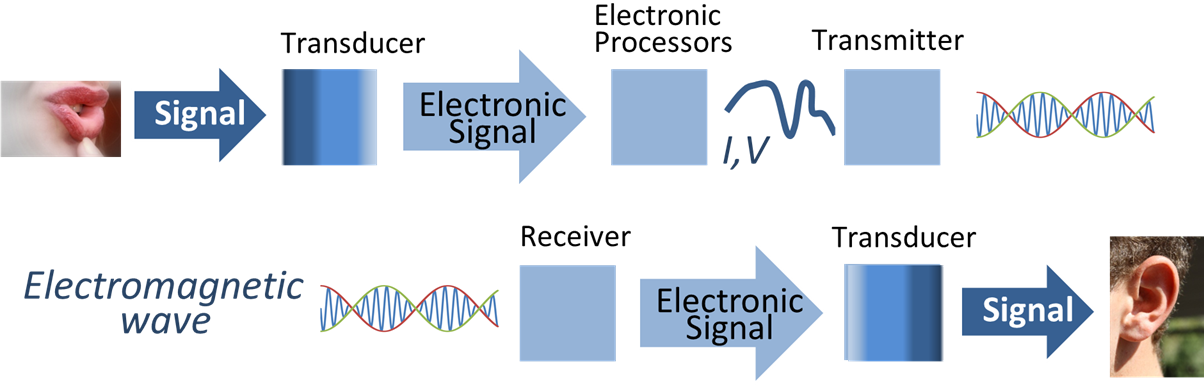
Transducers are used in electronic communications systems to convert signals of various physical forms to electronic signals, and vice versa. In this example, the first transducer could be a microphone, and the second transducer could be a speaker.

=== Electromagnetic ===
- Antennae – converts propagating electromagnetic waves to and from conducted electrical signals
- Magnetic cartridges – converts relative physical motion to and from electrical signals
- Tape head, disk read-and-write heads – converts magnetic fields on a magnetic medium to and from electrical signals
- Hall-effect sensors – convert a magnetic field level into an electrical signal
- Variable reluctance sensors – the movement of nearby ferrous metal objects induce an alternating current electrical signal
- Pickups – detect movement of metal strings and induce an electrical signal (AC voltage)

=== Electrochemical ===
- pH probes
- Electro-galvanic oxygen sensors
- Hydrogen sensors
- Potentiometric sensor

=== Electromechanical ===
Electromechanical input feeds meters and sensors, while electromechanical output devices are generically called actuators):

- Accelerometers
- Air flow sensors
- Electroactive polymers
- Rotary motors, linear motors
- Galvanometers
- Linear variable differential transformers or rotary variable differential transformers
- Load cells – converts force to mV/V electrical signal using strain gauges
- Microelectromechanical systems
- Potentiometers (when used for measuring position)
- Pressure sensors
- String potentiometers
- Tactile sensors
- Vibration powered generators
- Vibrating structure gyroscopes

=== Electroacoustic ===
- Loudspeakers, earphones – convert electrical signals into sound (amplified signal → magnetic field → motion → air pressure)
- Microphones – convert sound into an electrical signal (air pressure → motion of conductor/coil → magnetic field → electrical signal)
- Tactile transducers – convert electrical signal into vibration (electrical signal → vibration)
- Thermophones – convert electrical signals into temperature fluctuations, which become sound (electrical signal → periodic heating of a thin conductor → temperature waves → sound waves)
- Piezoelectric crystals – convert deformations of solid-state crystals (vibrations) to and from electrical signals
- Geophones – convert a ground movement (displacement) into voltage (vibrations → motion of conductor/coil → magnetic field → signal)
- Dynamic microphones – (air pressure → motion → magnetic field → electrical signal)
- Hydrophones – convert changes in water pressure into an electrical signal
- Sonar transponders (water pressure → Motion of conductor/coil → magnetic field → electrical signal)
- Ultrasonic transceivers, transmitting ultrasound (transduced from electricity) as well as receiving it after sound reflection from target objects, availing for imaging of those objects

=== Electro-optical ===
Also known as photoelectric:

- Fluorescent lamps – convert electrical power into incoherent light
- Incandescent lamps – convert electrical power into incoherent light
- Light-emitting diodes – convert electrical power into incoherent light
- Laser diodes – convert electrical power into coherent light
- Photodiodes, photoresistors, phototransistors, photomultipliers – convert changing light levels into electrical signals
- Photodetector or photoresistor or light-dependent resistor (LDR) – convert changes in light levels into changes in electrical resistance
- Cathode-ray tube (CRT) – convert electrical signals into visual signals

=== Electrostatic ===
- Electrometers

=== Thermoelectric ===
- Resistance temperature detectors (RTD) – convert temperature into an electrical resistance signal
- Thermocouples – convert relative temperatures of metallic junctions to electrical voltage
- Thermistors (includes PTC resistor and NTC resistor)

=== Radioacoustic ===
- Geiger-Müller tubes – convert incident ionizing radiation to an electrical impulse signal
- Radio receivers – convert electromagnetic transmissions to electrical signals.
- Radio transmitters – convert electrical signals to electromagnetic transmissions.

== See also ==
- Cybernetics
- Horn analyzer
- List of sensors
- Tactile sensor
