= Bourns, Inc. =

American electronics company

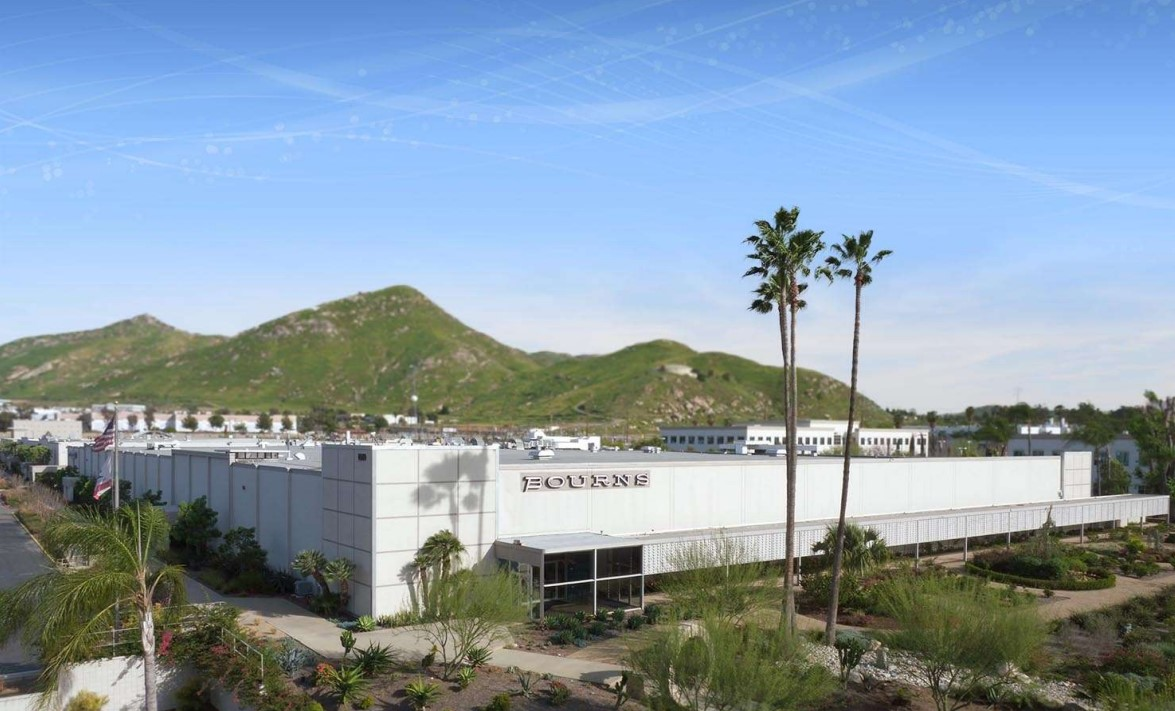
- Head quarter in Riverside, California
- Type: Privately held company
- Industry: Electronics
- Founded: 1947; 79 years ago in Altadena, California
- Founders: Marlan Bourns; Rosemary Bourns
- Headquarters: Riverside, California, United States
- Area served: Worldwide
- Key people: Gordon Bourns (Chairman and CEO)
- Number of employees: 9,000
- Subsidiaries: Rakon Limited
- Website: bourns.com

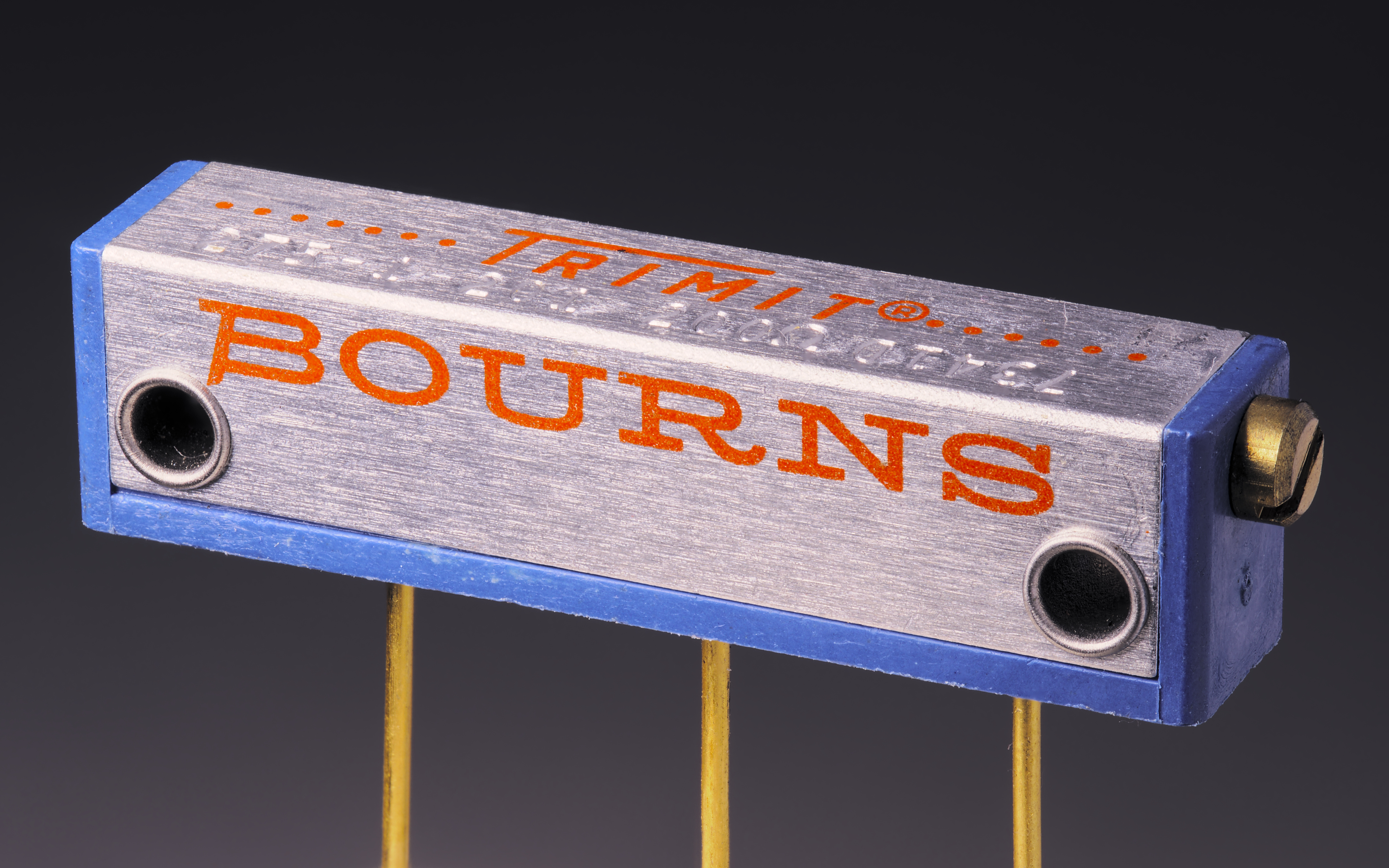
The "TRIMIT" potentiometer, one of the company's early innovations

Bourns, Inc. is an electronics company, headquartered in Riverside, California, that develops, manufactures and supplies electronic components for a variety of industries, including automotive, industrial, instrumentation, medical electronics, consumer equipment, and portable electronics.

Established in Altadena, California in 1947 by Marlan and Rosemary Bourns, graduates of the University of Michigan, the company was founded to develop and sell electronic components and sensors to the aerospace industry.

Bourns has 15 manufacturing facilities around the world and has continued growing through the development of new products and technologies as well as through acquisitions.

Its current chairman of the board and CEO is Gordon Bourns, the son of the co-founders.

== History ==
Marlan and Rosemary Bourns started the company in their 384-square-foot (35.7 m^{2}) garage in Altadena, California, in 1947. Their invention of linear-motion and vane position potentiometers provided a method for accurately determining an aircraft's pitch, and helped grow their business into a global corporation.

Headquartered in Riverside, California, Bourns makes and provides a broad range of electronic components and circuit protection devices including automotive sensors, circuit protection solutions, magnetic and inductor products, specialty engineering and manufacturing services, precision potentiometers, panel controls, encoders and resistive products.

== Technology innovations ==
In 1952, Bourns patented the trimming potentiometer, trademarked "Trimpot". In 1995, Bourns acquired VRN's Trimmer assets and introduced the first 4 mm surface-mount sealed tact switch. In 2008, Bourns acquired the Transient Blocking Unit (TBU) assets of Fultec Semiconductor, Inc.

== Acquisitions ==
- 2001: Joslyn GDT Division assets
- 2003: Telecom Protection assets from Texas Instruments Sensors & Controls Division
- 2003: Microelectronic Modules Corporation assets
- 2004: MMC's Switch Power Products assets
- 2004: RUF Automotive Group
- 2005: Tyco/Meggitt's Fuel Card Product assets
- 2006: J.W. Miller Magnetics Business
- 2006: the Automotive Controls Division assets of SSI Technologies
- 2006: Polymer PTC division of Therm-O-Disc, Inc.
- 2008: the Transient Blocking Unit (TBU) assets of Fultec Semiconductor, Inc.
- 2008: the Protection Products assets of Emerson Network Power Energy Systems
- 2009: Central Office Surge Protection Products assets from Corning Cable Systems LLC
- 2012: Assets from Jensen Devices AB, Stockholm, Sweden
- 2014: Komatsulite Mfg. Co., Ltd
- 2015: Murata Manufacturing Co., Ltd.'s trimming potentiometer business
- 2021: Kaschke Components GmbH
