= Potentiometric sensor =

Type of chemical sensor

A potentiometric sensor is a type of chemical sensor that may be used to determine the analytical concentration of some components of the analyte gas or solution. These sensors measure the electrical potential of an electrode when no current is present.

== Principle ==
The signal is measured as the potential difference (voltage) between the working electrode and the reference electrode. The working electrode's potential must depend on the concentration of the analyte in the gas or solution phase. The reference electrode is needed to provide a defined reference potential.

== Classification of sensors ==
Potentiometric solid state gas sensors have been generally classified into three broad groups.

- Type I sensors have an electrolyte containing mobile ions of the chemical species in the gas phase that it is monitoring. The commercial product, YSZ oxygen sensor, is an example of type I.
- Type II sensors do not have mobile ions of the chemical species to be sensed, but an ion related to the target gas can diffuse in the solid electrolyte to allow equilibration with the atmosphere. Therefore, type I and type II sensors have the same design with gas electrodes combined with metal and an electrolyte where oxidized or reduced ions can be electrochemically equilibrated through the electrochemical cell. In the third type of electrochemical sex, auxiliary phases are added to the electrodes to enhance the selectivity and stability.
- Type III sensors make the electrode concept even more confusing. With respect to the design of a solid state sensor, the auxiliary phase looks as part of the electrode. But it cannot be an electrode because auxiliary phase materials are not generally good electrical conductor. In spite of this confusion, type III design offers more feasibility in terms of designing various sensors with different auxiliary materials and electrolytes.

== See also ==
- Potentiometer
