= Potentiometer =

Type of resistor, usually with three terminals

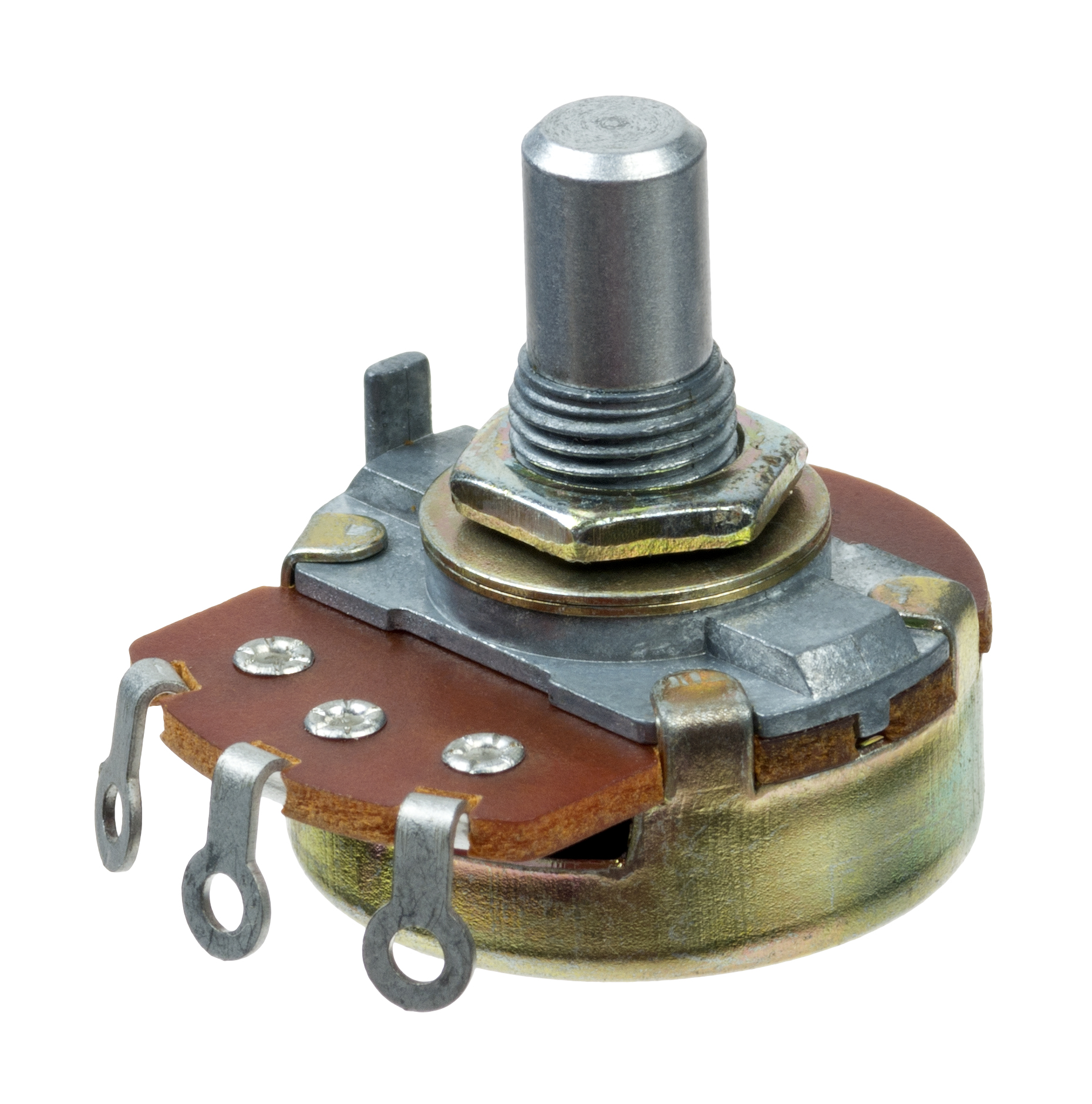
- A typical single-turn potentiometer
- Component type: Passive

Electronic symbol
- (IEC standard) (ANSI standard)

A potentiometer is a three-terminal resistor with a sliding or rotating contact that forms an adjustable voltage divider. In motion control systems, potentiometers are frequently used as position sensors to provide analog feedback to a controller, allowing for precise tracking of mechanical movement. If only two terminals are used, one end and the wiper, it acts as a variable resistor or rheostat.

The measuring instrument called a potentiometer is essentially a voltage divider used for measuring electric potential (voltage); the component is an implementation of the same principle, hence its name.

Potentiometers are commonly used to control electrical devices such as volume controls on audio equipment. It is also used in speed control of fans. Potentiometers operated by a mechanism can be used as position transducers, for example, in a joystick. Potentiometers are rarely used to directly control significant power (more than a watt), since the power dissipated in the potentiometer would be comparable to the power in the controlled load.

== Nomenclature ==
Some terms in the electronics industry used to describe certain types of potentiometers are:

- pot—abbreviation for potentiometer
- slide pot or slider pot—a potentiometer that is adjusted by sliding the wiper left or right (or up and down, depending on the installation), usually with a finger or thumb. The alternative term fader is used specifically for potentiometers of audio equipments and musical instruments, such as mixing consoles, electronic keyboards, and amplifiers
- thumb pot or thumbwheel pot—a small rotating potentiometer meant to be adjusted infrequently by means of a small thumbwheel
- trimpot or trimmer pot—a trimmer potentiometer typically meant to be adjusted once or infrequently for "fine-tuning" an electrical signal

== Construction ==
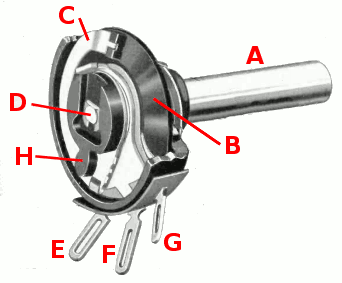
Cutaway drawing of potentiometer showing parts: (A) shaft, (B) stationary carbon composition resistance element, (C) phosphor bronze wiper, (D) shaft attached to wiper, (E, G) terminals connected to ends of resistance element, (F) terminal connected to wiper. A mechanical stop (H) prevents rotation past end points.

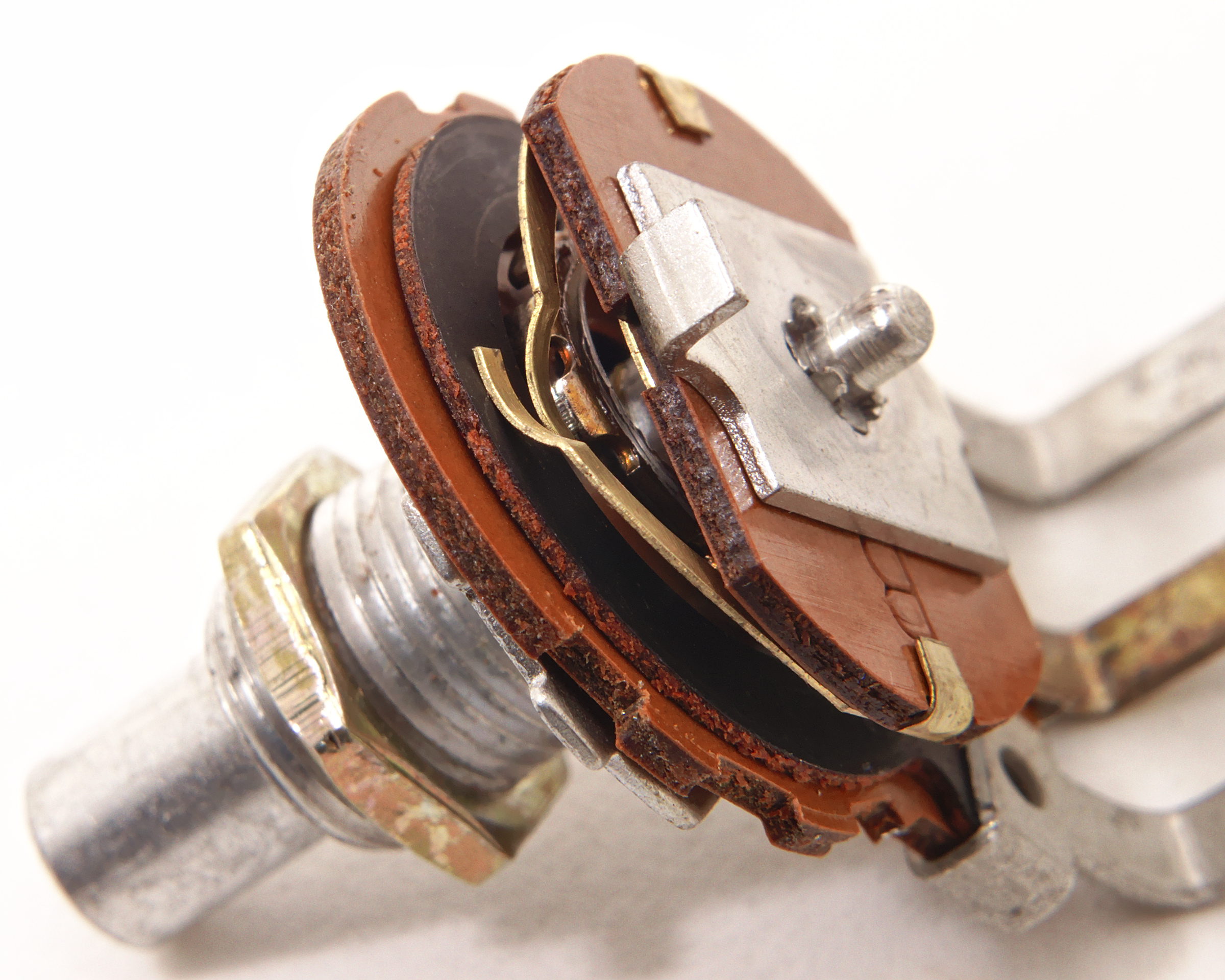
Single-turn potentiometer with metal casing removed to expose wiper contacts and resistive track

Potentiometers consist of: a resistive element; a sliding contact (wiper) that moves along the element, making good electrical contact with one part of it; electrical terminals at each end of the element; a mechanism that moves the wiper from one end to the other; and a housing containing the element and wiper.

Many inexpensive potentiometers are constructed with a resistive element (B in cutaway drawing) formed into an arc of a circle usually a little less than a full turn and a wiper (C) sliding on this element when rotated, making electrical contact. The resistive element can be flat or angled. Each end of the resistive element is connected to a terminal (E, G) on the case. The wiper is connected to a third terminal (F), usually between the other two. On panel potentiometers, the wiper is usually the center terminal of three. For single-turn potentiometers, this wiper typically travels just under one revolution around the contact. The only point of ingress for contamination is the narrow space between the shaft and the housing it rotates in.

Another type is the linear slider potentiometer, which has a wiper which slides along a linear element instead of rotating. Contamination can potentially enter anywhere along the slot the slider moves in, making effective sealing more difficult and compromising long-term reliability. An advantage of the slider potentiometer is that the slider position gives a visual indication of its setting. While the setting of a rotary potentiometer can be seen by the position of a marking on the knob, an array of sliders can give a visual impression of settings as in a graphic equalizer or faders on a mixing console.

The resistive element of inexpensive potentiometers is often made of graphite. Other materials used include resistance wire, carbon particles in plastic, and a ceramic/metal mixture called cermet.

Conductive track potentiometers use conductive polymer resistor pastes that contain hard-wearing resins and polymers, solvents, and lubricant, in addition to the carbon that provides the conductive properties.

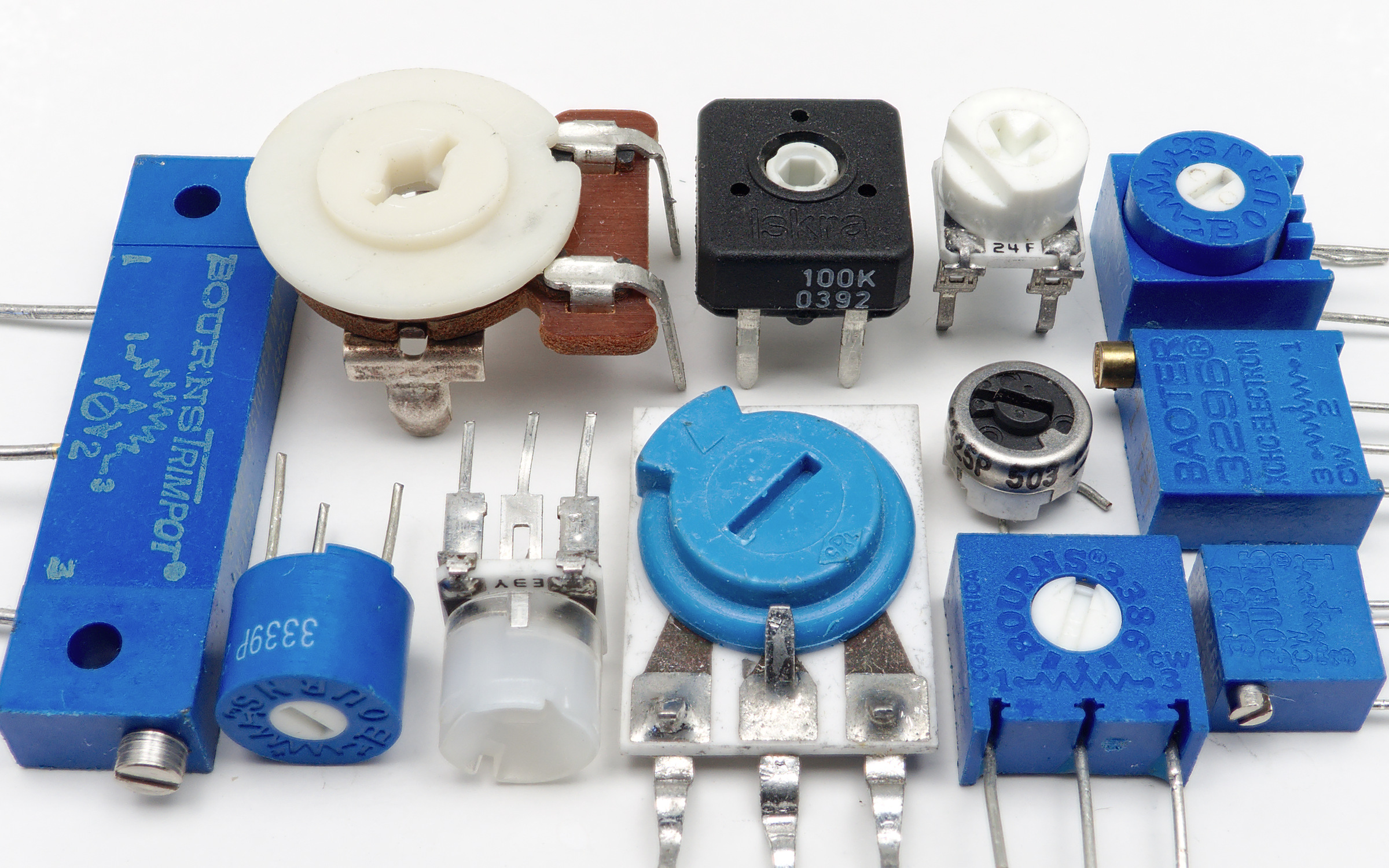
PCB mount trimmer potentiometers, or "trimpots", intended for infrequent adjustment

Electronic symbol for pre-set potentiometer

Multiturn potentiometers are also operated by rotating a shaft, but by several turns rather than less than a full turn. Some multiturn potentiometers have a linear resistive element with a sliding contact moved by a lead screw; others have a helical resistive element and a wiper that turns through 10, 20, or more complete revolutions, moving along the helix as it rotates. Multiturn potentiometers, both user-accessible and preset, allow finer adjustments; rotation through the same angle changes the setting by typically a tenth as much as for a simple rotary potentiometer.

A string potentiometer is a multi-turn potentiometer operated by an attached reel of wire turning against a spring, allowing it to convert linear position to a variable resistance.

User-accessible rotary potentiometers can be fitted with a switch which operates usually at the anti-clockwise extreme of rotation. Before digital electronics became the norm such a component was used to allow radio and television receivers and other equipment to be switched on at minimum volume with an audible click, then the volume increased by turning the same knob. In other applications, such as domestic light dimmers, the normal usage pattern is best satisfied if the potentiometer remains set at its current position, so the switch is operated by a push action, alternately on and off, by axial presses of the knob.

Multiple resistance elements can be ganged together with their sliding contacts on the same shaft, for example in stereo audio amplifiers for volume control. Blending or balance controls have resistive elements in opposite directions so that each channel is at equal level in the middle and one or the other channel is at maximum resistance at opposite extremes of rotation. These can have tapers that each only cover half of the track so that both channels are at full volume in the middle and only one or the other channel is affected at other positions in rotation.

Other potentiometers are enclosed within the equipment and are intended to only be adjusted when calibrating the equipment during manufacture or repair, and not otherwise touched. They are usually physically much smaller than user-accessible potentiometers, and may need to be operated by a screwdriver rather than having a knob. They are usually called "trimmer", "trim[ming]", or "preset" potentiometers (or pots), or the genericized brand name "trimpot".

=== Resistance–position relationship: "taper" ===
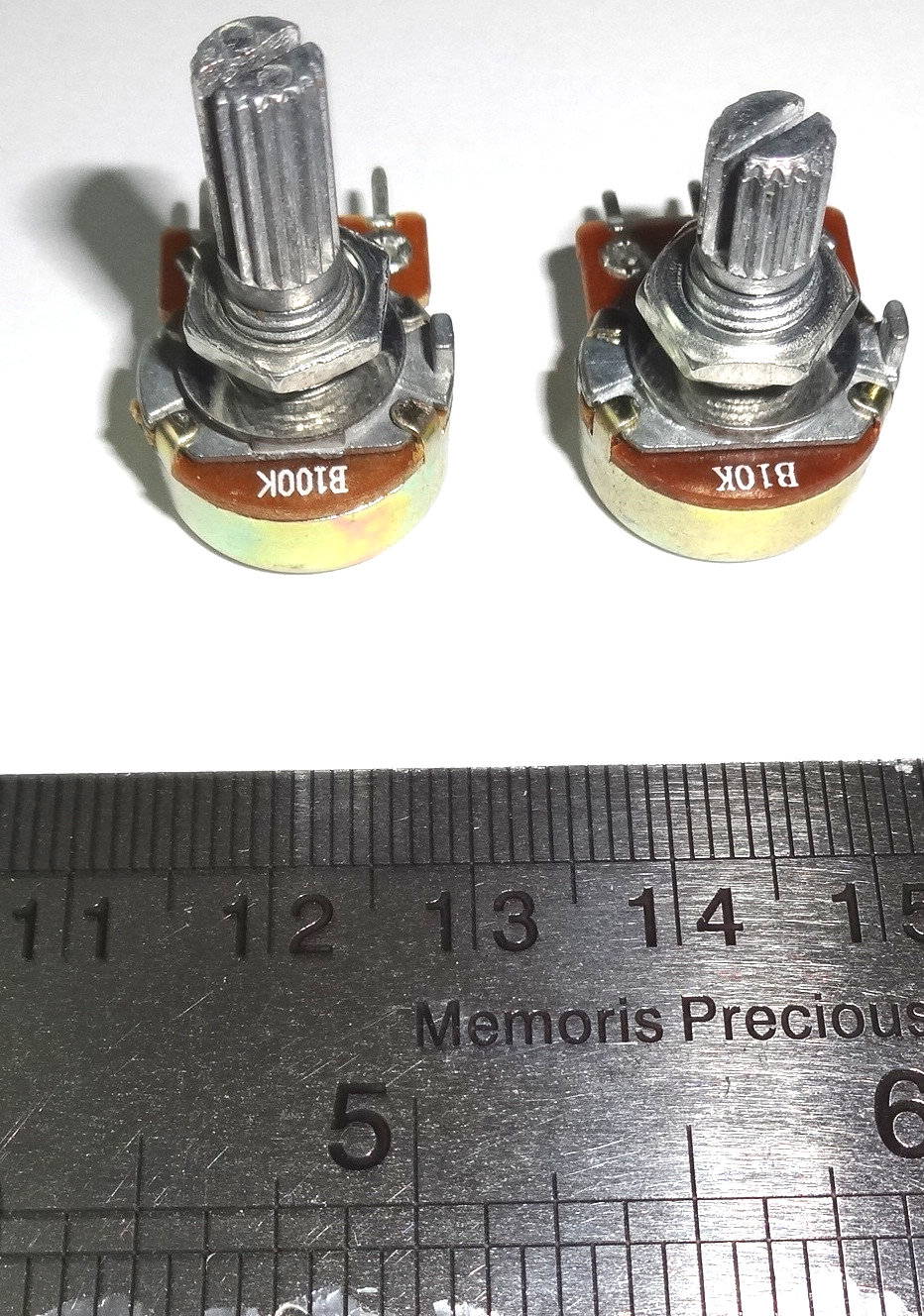
Size scaled 10k and 100k pots that combine traditional mountings and knob shafts with newer and smaller electrical assemblies. The "B" designates a linear (USA/Asian style) taper.

The relationship between slider position and resistance, known as the "taper" or "law", can be controlled during manufacture by changing the composition or thickness of the resistance coating along the resistance element. Although in principle any taper is possible, two types are widely manufactured: linear and logarithmic (aka "audio taper") potentiometers.

A letter code may be used to identify which taper is used, but the letter code definitions are not standardized. Potentiometers made in Asia and the US are usually marked with an "A" for logarithmic taper or a "B" for linear taper; "C" for the rarely seen reverse logarithmic taper. Others, particularly those from Europe, may be marked with an "A" for linear taper, a "C" or "B" for logarithmic taper, or an "F" for reverse logarithmic taper. The code used also varies between different manufacturers. When a percentage is referenced with a non-linear taper, it relates to the resistance value at the midpoint of the shaft rotation. A 10% log taper would therefore measure 10% of the total resistance at the midpoint of the rotation; i.e. 10% log taper on a 10 kOhm potentiometer would yield 1 kOhm at the midpoint. The higher the percentage, the steeper the log curve.

==== Linear taper potentiometer ====
A linear taper potentiometer (linear describes the electrical characteristic of the device, not the geometry of the resistive element) has a resistive element of constant cross-section, resulting in a device where the resistance between the contact (wiper) and one end terminal is proportional to the distance between them. Linear taper potentiometers are used when the division ratio of the potentiometer must be proportional to the angle of shaft rotation (or slider position), for example, controls used for adjusting the centering of the display on an analog cathode-ray oscilloscope. Precision potentiometers have an accurate relationship between resistance and slider position.

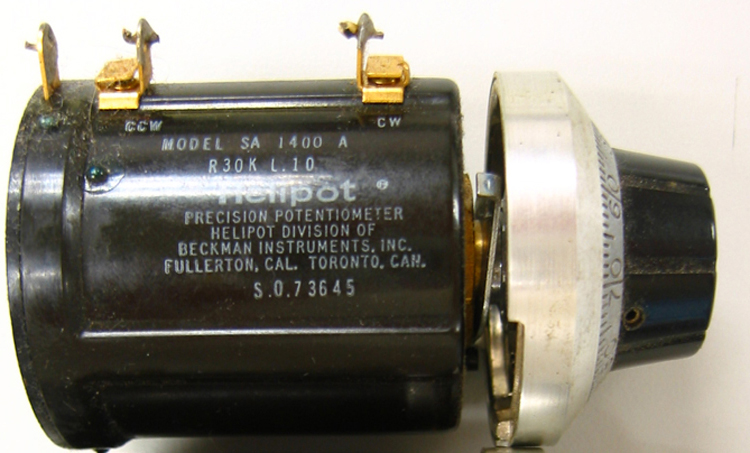
Beckman Helipot precision potentiometer

==== Logarithmic potentiometer ====
A logarithmic taper potentiometer is a potentiometer that has a bias built into the resistive element, meaning the center position of the potentiometer is not one half of the total value of the potentiometer. The resistive element is designed to follow a logarithmic taper, aka a mathematical exponent or "squared" profile. A logarithmic taper potentiometer is constructed with a resistive element that either "tapers" in from one end to the other, or is made from a material whose resistivity varies from one end to the other. This results in a device where output voltage is a logarithmic function of the slider position.

Most (cheaper) "log" potentiometers are not accurately logarithmic, but use two regions of different resistance (but constant resistivity) to approximate a logarithmic law. The two resistive tracks overlap at approximately 50% of the potentiometer rotation; this gives a stepwise logarithmic taper. A logarithmic potentiometer can also be simulated with a linear one and an external resistor. True logarithmic potentiometers are significantly more expensive.

Logarithmic taper potentiometers are often used for volume or signal level in audio systems, as human perception of audio volume is logarithmic, according to the Weber–Fechner law.

==== Contactless potentiometer ====
Unlike mechanical potentiometers, non-contact potentiometers use an optical disk to trigger an infrared sensor, or a magnet to trigger a magnetic sensor (as long as there are other types of sensors, such as capacitive, other types of non-contact potentiometers can probably be built), and then an electronic circuit does the signal processing to provide an output signal that can be analogue or digital.

An example of a non-contact potentiometer can be found with the AS5600 integrated circuit. However, absolute encoders must also use similar principles, although being for industrial use, certainly the cost must be unfeasible for use in domestic appliances.

== Rheostat ==
The most common way to vary the resistance in a circuit continuously is to use a rheostat. Because of the change in resistance, they can also be used to adjust magnitude of current in a circuit. The word rheostat was coined in 1843 by Sir Charles Wheatstone, from the Greek ῥέος rheos meaning 'stream', and -στάτης -states (from ἱστάναι histanai, 'to set, to cause to stand') meaning 'setter, regulating device', which is a two-terminal variable resistor. For low-power applications (less than about 1 watt) a three-terminal potentiometer is often used, with one terminal unconnected or connected to the wiper.

Where the rheostat must be rated for higher power (more than about 1 watt), it may be built with a resistance wire wound around a semi-circular insulator, with the wiper sliding from one turn of the wire to the next. Sometimes a rheostat is made from resistance wire wound on a heat-resisting cylinder, with the slider made from a number of metal fingers that grip lightly onto a small portion of the turns of resistance wire. The "fingers" can be moved along the coil of resistance wire by a sliding knob thus changing the "tapping" point. Wire-wound rheostats made with ratings up to several thousand watts are used in applications such as DC motor drives, electric welding controls, or in the controls for generators. The rating of the rheostat is given with the full resistance value and the allowable power dissipation is proportional to the fraction of the total device resistance in circuit. Carbon-pile rheostats are used as load banks for testing automobile batteries and power supplies.

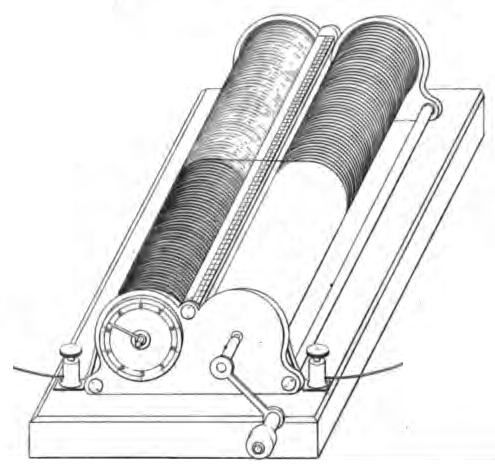
Charles Wheatstone's 1843 rheostat with a metal and a wooden cylinder

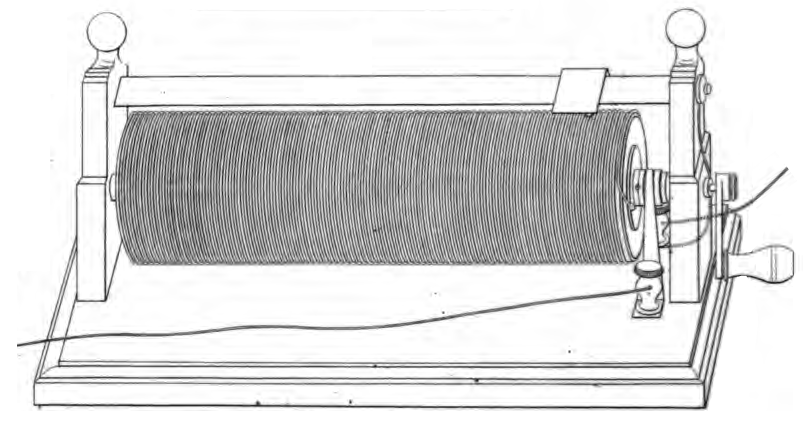
Charles Wheatstone's 1843 rheostat with a moving whisker

Electronic symbol for rheostat

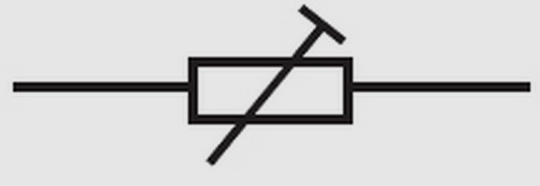
Electronic symbol for trimmer rheostat

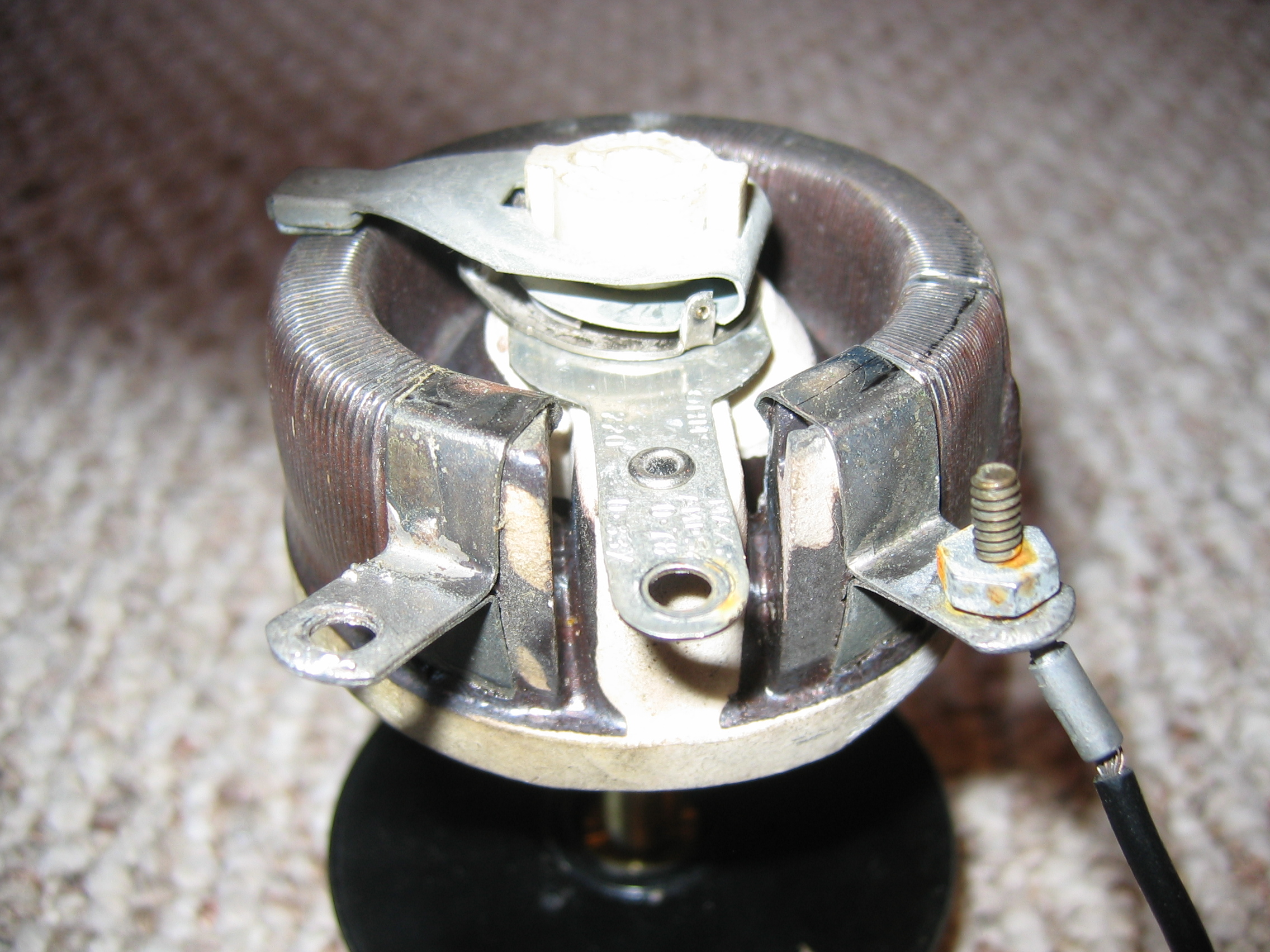
A high-power wirewound potentiometer

== Digital potentiometer ==
A digital potentiometer (often called digipot) is an electronic component that mimics the functions of analog potentiometers. Through digital input signals, the resistance between two terminals can be adjusted, just as in an analog potentiometer. There are two main functional types: volatile, which lose their set position if power is removed, and are usually designed to initialise at the minimum position, and non-volatile, which retain their set position using a storage mechanism similar to flash memory or EEPROM.

Usage of a digipot is far more complex than that of a simple mechanical potentiometer, and there are many limitations to observe; nevertheless they are widely used, often for factory adjustment and calibration of equipment, especially where the limitations of mechanical potentiometers are problematic. A digipot is generally immune to the effects of moderate long-term mechanical vibration or environmental contamination, to the same extent as other semiconductor devices, and can be secured electronically against unauthorised tampering by protecting the access to its programming inputs by various means.

In equipment which has a microprocessor, FPGA or other functional logic which can store settings and reload them to the "potentiometer" every time the equipment is powered up, a multiplying DAC can be used in place of a digipot, and this can offer higher setting resolution, less drift with temperature, and more operational flexibility.

== Membrane potentiometers ==
A membrane potentiometer uses a conductive membrane that is deformed by a sliding element to contact a resistor voltage divider. Linearity can range from 0.50% to 5% depending on the material, design and manufacturing process. The repeat accuracy is typically between 0.1 mm and 1.0 mm with a theoretically infinite resolution. The service life of these types of potentiometers is typically 1 million to 20 million cycles depending on the materials used during manufacturing and the actuation method; contact and contactless (magnetic) methods are available (to sense position). Many different material variations are available such as PET, FR4, and Kapton. Membrane potentiometer manufacturers offer linear, rotary, and application-specific variations. The linear versions can range from 9 mm to 1000 mm in length and the rotary versions range from 20 to 450 mm in diameter, with each having a height of 0.5 mm. Membrane potentiometers can be used for position sensing.

For touch-screen devices using resistive technology, a two-dimensional membrane potentiometer provides x and y coordinates. The top layer is thin glass spaced close to a neighboring inner layer. The underside of the top layer has a transparent conductive coating; the surface of the layer beneath it has a transparent resistive coating. A finger or stylus deforms the glass to contact the underlying layer. Edges of the resistive layer have conductive contacts. Locating the contact point is done by applying a voltage to opposite edges, leaving the other two edges temporarily unconnected. The voltage of the top layer provides one coordinate. Disconnecting those two edges, and applying voltage to the other two, formerly unconnected, provides the other coordinate. Alternating rapidly between pairs of edges provides frequent position updates. An analog-to-digital converter provides output data.

Advantages of such sensors are that only five connections to the sensor are needed, and the associated electronics is comparatively simple. Another is that any material that depresses the top layer over a small area works well. A disadvantage is that sufficient force must be applied to make contact. Another is that the sensor requires occasional calibration to match touch location to the underlying display. (Capacitive sensors require no calibration or contact force, only proximity of a finger or other conductive object. However, they are significantly more complex.)

== Applications ==
Potentiometers are rarely used to directly control significant amounts of power (more than a watt or so). Instead they are used to adjust the level of analog signals (for example volume controls audio equipment), and as control inputs for electronic circuits. For example, a light dimmer uses a potentiometer to control the switching of a TRIAC and so indirectly to control the brightness of lamps.

Preset potentiometers are widely used throughout electronics wherever adjustments must be made during manufacturing or servicing.

User-actuated potentiometers are widely used as user controls, and may control a very wide variety of equipment functions. The widespread use of potentiometers in consumer electronics declined in the 1990s, with rotary incremental encoders, up/down push-buttons, and other digital controls now more common. However they remain in many applications, such as volume controls and as position sensors.

=== Audio control ===
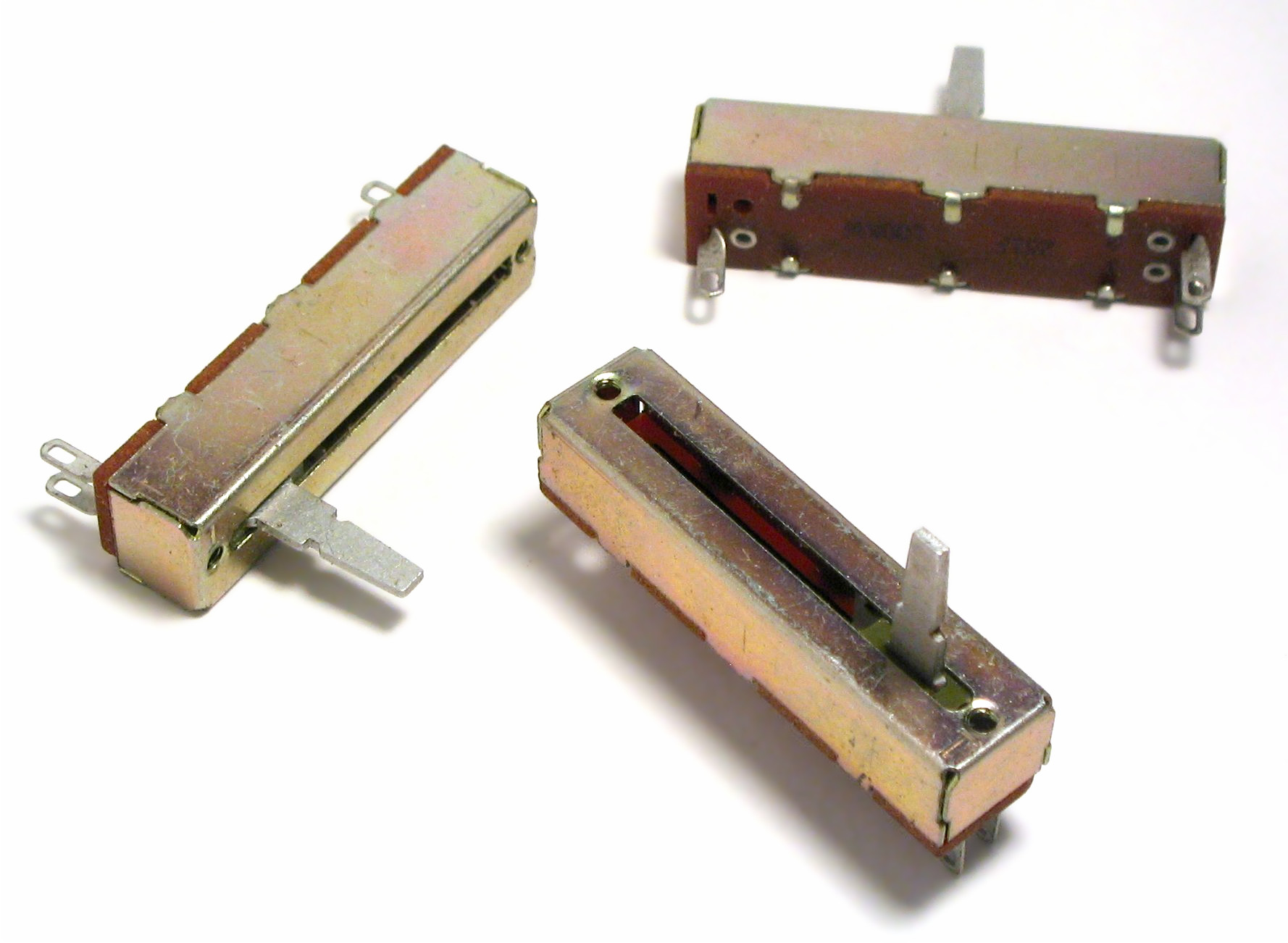
Slide potentiometers (faders)

Low-power potentiometers, both slide and rotary, are used to control audio equipment, changing loudness, frequency attenuation, and other characteristics of audio signals.

The 'log pot', which is a potentiometer that has a resistance, taper, or, "curve" (or law) of a logarithmic (log) form, is used as the volume control in audio power amplifiers, where it is also called an "audio taper pot" because the amplitude response of the human ear is approximately logarithmic. It ensures that on a volume control marked 0 to 10, for example, a setting of 5 sounds subjectively half as loud as a setting of 10. There is also an anti-log pot or reverse audio taper which is simply the reverse of a logarithmic potentiometer. It is almost always used in a ganged configuration with a logarithmic potentiometer, for instance, in an audio balance control.

Potentiometers used in combination with filter networks act as tone controls or equalizers.

In audio systems, the word linear is sometimes applied in a confusing way to describe slide potentiometers because of the straight line nature of the physical sliding motion. The word linear, when applied to a potentiometer regardless of being a slide or rotary type, describes a linear relationship of the pot's position versus the measured value of the pot's tap (wiper or electrical output) pin.

=== Television ===
Potentiometers were formerly used to control picture brightness, contrast, and color response. A potentiometer was often used to adjust "vertical hold", which affected the synchronization between the receiver's internal sweep circuit (sometimes a multivibrator) and the received picture signal, along with other things such as audio-video carrier offset, tuning frequency (for push-button sets) and so on. It also helps in frequency modulation of waves.

=== Motion control ===
Potentiometers can be used as position feedback devices in order to create closed-loop control, such as in a servomechanism. This method of motion control is the simplest method of measuring the angle or displacement.

=== Transducers ===
Potentiometers are also very widely used as a part of displacement transducers because of the simplicity of construction and because they can give a large output signal.

=== Computation ===
In analog computers, high precision potentiometers are used to scale intermediate results by desired constant factors, or to set initial conditions for a calculation. A motor-driven potentiometer may be used as a function generator, using a non-linear resistance card to supply approximations to trigonometric functions. For example, the shaft rotation might represent an angle, and the voltage division ratio can be made proportional to the cosine of the angle.

== Theory of operation ==
A potentiometer with a resistive load, showing equivalent fixed resistors for clarity

The potentiometer can be used as a voltage divider to obtain a manually adjustable output voltage at the slider (wiper) from a fixed input voltage applied across the two ends of the potentiometer. This is their most common use.

The voltage across R_{L} can be calculated by
$$V_\text{L} = \frac{R_2 R_\text{L}}{R_1 R_\text{L} + R_2 R_\text{L} + R_1 R_2} \cdot V_\text{S}.$$

If R_{L} is large compared to the other resistances (like the input to an operational amplifier), the output voltage can be approximated by the simpler equation
$$V_\text{L} = \frac{R_2}{R_1 + R_2 }\cdot V_\text{S}$$
(dividing throughout by R_{L} and cancelling terms with R_{L} as denominator).

As an example, assume $V_\text{S} = 10~\text{V}$, $R_1 = 1~\text{k}\Omega$, $R_2 = 2~\text{k}\Omega$, and $R_\text{L} = 100~\text{k}\Omega.$

Since the load resistance is large compared to the other resistances, the output voltage V_{L} will be approximately
$$\frac{2~\text{k}\Omega}{1~\text{k}\Omega + 2~\text{k}\Omega} \cdot 10~\text{V} =
\frac{2}{3} \cdot 10~\text{V} \approx 6.667~\text{V}.$$
Because of the load resistance, however, it will actually be slightly lower, ≈ 6.623 V.

One of the advantages of the potential divider compared to a variable resistor in series with the source is that, while variable resistors have a maximum resistance where some current will always flow, dividers are able to vary the output voltage from maximum (V_{S}) to ground (zero volts) as the wiper moves from one end of the potentiometer to the other. There is, however, always a small amount of contact resistance.

In addition, the load resistance is often not known, and therefore simply placing a variable resistor in series with the load could have a negligible effect or an excessive effect, depending on the load.

== Failure ==
Ageing may cause intermittent contact between the resistive track and the wiper as it is rotated. In volume control use this causes crackling.

== See also ==
- Potentiometric sensor
- Trimmer
- Motorized potentiometer
